= Macanal Formation =

Geologic formation in Colombia

- Stratigraphic range: Berriasian-Valanginian; ~140–132 Ma
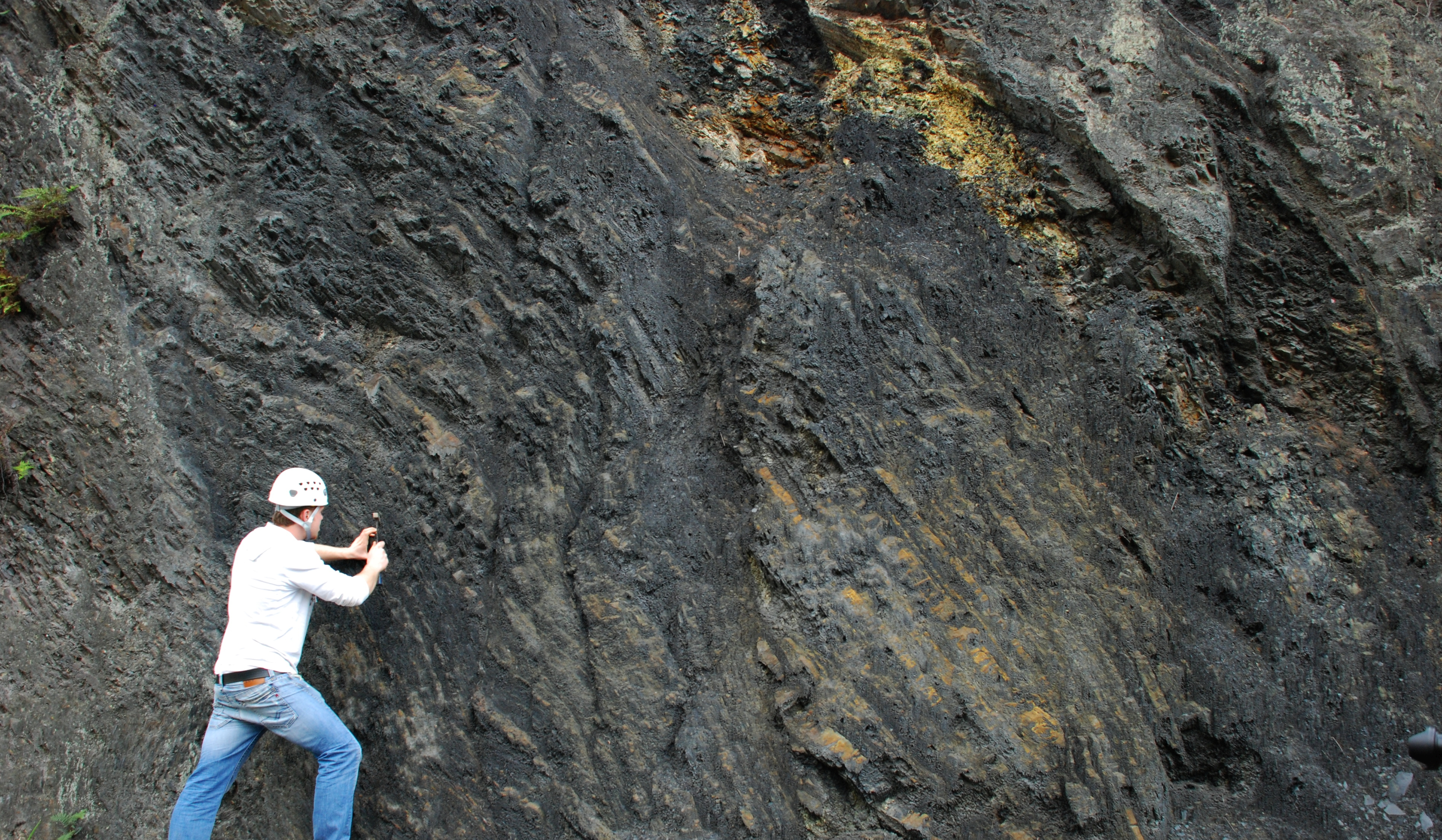
- Outcrop of the Macanal Formation along the road between Bogotá and Villavicencio
- Type: Geological formation
- Unit of: Cáqueza Group
- Underlies: Las Juntas Formation
- Overlies: Guavio Fm., Santa Rosa Fm., Ubalá Fm., Chivor Fm., Batá Fm.
- Thickness: up to 2,935 m (9,629 ft)

Lithology
- Primary: Organic shale
- Other: Limestone, gypsum, emeralds

Location
- Coordinates: 4°58′19″N 73°19′10″W
- Region: Altiplano Cundiboyacense & Tenza Valley; Eastern Ranges; Andes
- Country: Colombia

Type section
- Named for: Macanal
- Named by: Rodríguez & Ulloa
- Location: Macanal
- Year defined: 1979
- Coordinates: 4°58′19″N 73°19′10″W
- Region: Boyacá
- Country: Colombia

The Macanal Formation or Macanal Shale (Spanish: (Formación) Lutitas de Macanal, Kilm, K1m) is a fossiliferous geological formation of the Altiplano Cundiboyacense and Tenza Valley in the Eastern Ranges of the Colombian Andes. The predominantly organic shale formation dates to the Early Cretaceous period; Berriasian to Valanginian epochs and has a maximum thickness of 2,935 metres (9,629 ft). The Macanal Formation contains numerous levels of fossiliferous abundances. Bivalves, ammonites and fossil flora have been found in the formation.

The formation is a source rock for oil and gas in the Eastern Cordillera Basin and adjacent Llanos Basin foothills and provides emeralds in the vicinity of Macanal, after which the formation is named.

== Etymology ==
The formation was defined and named in 1979 by Rodríguez and Ulloa after Macanal, Cundinamarca. The name Macanal is either derived from the Muysccubun word Macana, meaning garrote, or from the Macana palm tree.

== Description ==
=== Lithologies ===
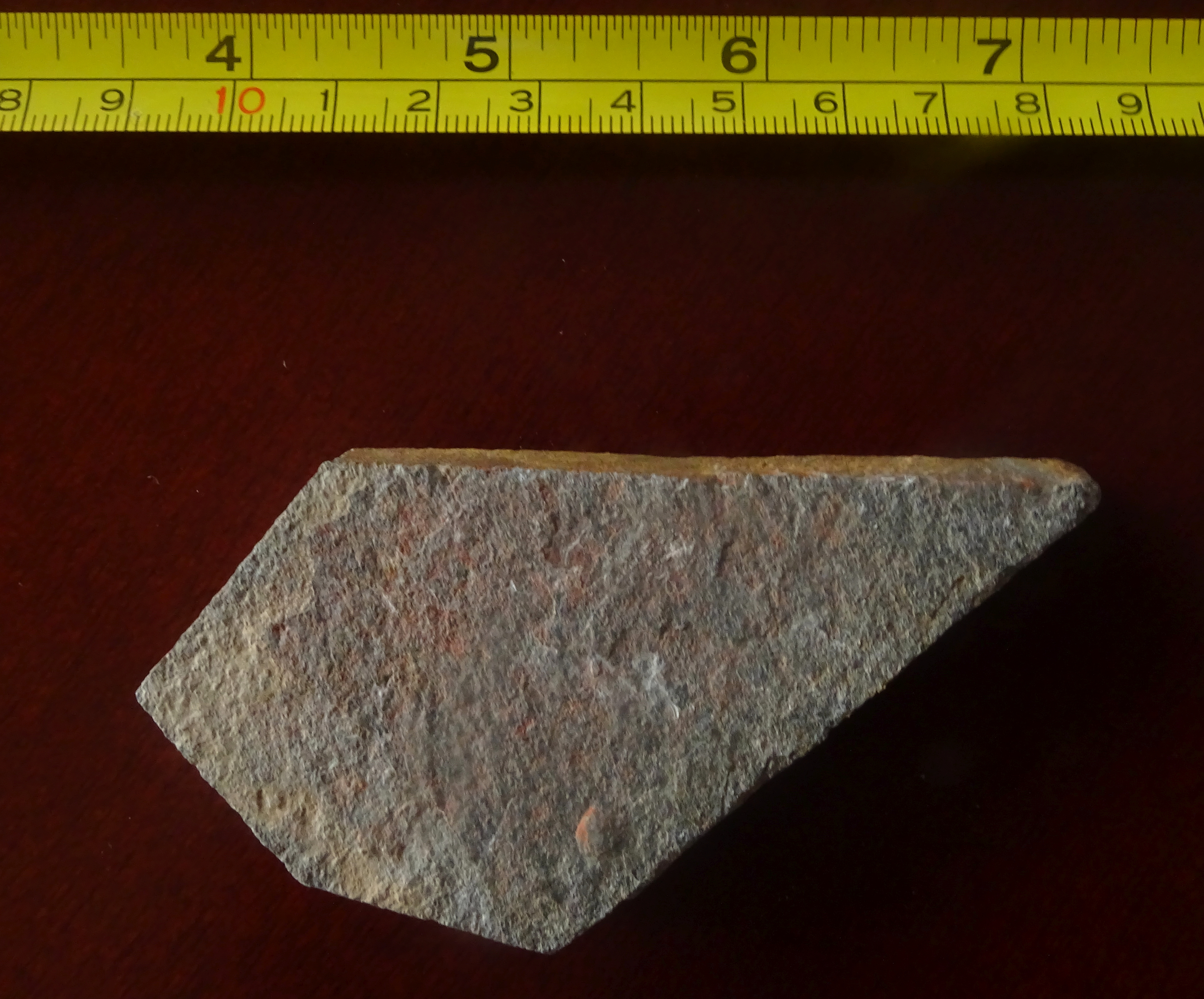
Fractured sample of the Macanal Formation

The Macanal Formation has a maximum thickness of 2,935 metres (9,629 ft), and is characterised by a sequence of micaceous organic shales, with calcite veins and gypsum occurrences intercalated in the formation. The Macanal Formation contains high values of TOC. In the Eastern Cordillera Basin and the adjacent foothills of the Llanos Basin, the Macanal Formation is a source rock for oil and gas. In the vicinity of Macanal, the formation provides emeralds.

=== Stratigraphy and depositional environment ===
The Macanal Formation, a unit of the Cáqueza Group, concordantly overlies the Guavio, Santa Rosa, Ubalá, Chivor and Batá Formations, and is concordantly overlain by the Las Juntas Formation. The age has been estimated to be Berriasian to Valanginian. Stratigraphically, the formation is time equivalent with the Mercedes, Tambor, Rosablanca, Murca and La Naveta Formations. The formation has been deposited in a shallow marine environment in an enclosed basin, with as provenance areas the Santander High and the Guiana Shield. The Macanal Formation is part of the syn-rift sequence of eastern Colombia.

=== Fossil content ===
The Macanal Formation contains numerous levels of fossiliferous abundances. Bivalves, ammonites and flora have been found in the formation. Ammonites of Substeueroceras cf. mutabile, Sarasinella cf. hondana, Subalpinites sp., Berriasela sp., Neocomites cf. wichmanni, Olcostephanus sp., Olcostephanus cf. atherstoni, Favrella cf. colombiana, Acanthodiscus sp. have been registered in the formation, as well as bivalves of Corbis (Sphaera) cf. corrugata, Trigonia cf. hondana, Trigonia (Buchotrigonia) cf. abrupta, Trigonia (Notoscabrotrigonia) cf. tocaimaana, and Exogyra cf. boussingaulti. Analysis of the deformation registered in ammonite fossils has helped in understanding the tectonic history of the Llanos foothills of the Eastern Ranges.

== Outcrops ==
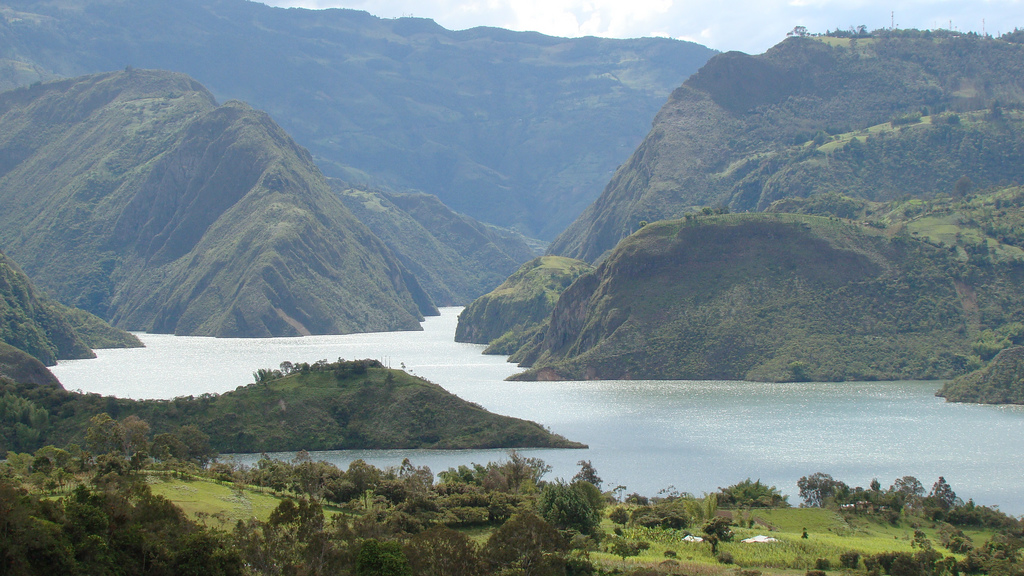
The Macanal Formation is found bordering the Guavio Reservoir

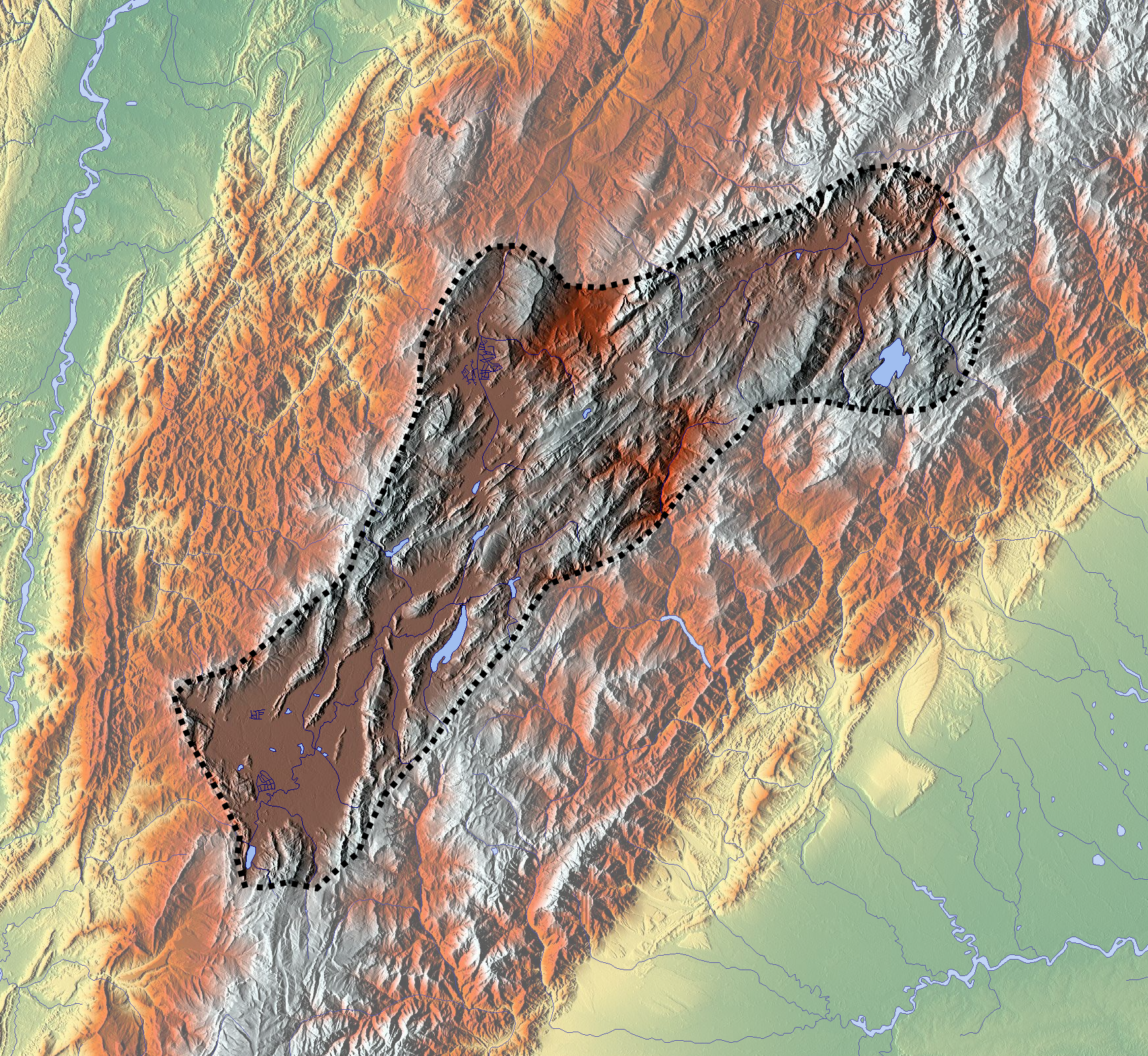
Type locality of the Macanal Formation in the Tenza Valley to the east of the Altiplano Cundiboyacense

The Macanal Formation is apart from its type locality in the Batá River canyon, found in the Cravo Sur anticline, east of the Ocetá Páramo, in the Desespero Synclinal in the southern and northern parts of Labranzagrande, around Páez and Campohermoso, in the eastern part of Gama, bordering the Guavio Reservoir, and in the Servitá Synclinal, west of Villavicencio. The Macanal Formation crops out along the road between Bogotá and Villavicencio and is there heavily fractured and folded. The Macanal Formation is the most extensive formation around Cáqueza, and Gachalá, Cundinamarca.

The Pajarito Fault thrusts the Macanal Formation on top of the Fómeque Formation to the east of Lake Tota, and the Chámeza Fault thrusts the Macanal Formation on top of the overlying Las Juntas Formation around Chámeza, Casanare. The Ubaque Fault forms the contact between the Fómeque Formation and the Macanal Formation, while the Las Mercedes Fault puts the Quetame Group in contact with the Macanal Formation near Quetame, as does the San Juanito Fault. The Servitá Fault forms the contact between the Guatiquía Redbeds and the Macanal Formation, and the Upín Fault, part of the same system puts the Macanal Formation in contact with the Tertiary Palmichal Group. At this contact, brines are extracted from the formation.

== Regional correlations ==
Stratigraphy of the Llanos Basin and surrounding provinces
Ma	Age	Paleomap	Regional events	Catatumbo	Cordillera	proximal Llanos	distal Llanos	Putumayo	VSM	Environments	Maximum thickness	Petroleum geology	Notes
0.01	Holocene		Holocene volcanism Seismic activity	alluvium								Overburden	
1	Pleistocene		Pleistocene volcanism Andean orogeny 3 Glaciations	Guayabo	Soatá; Sabana	Necesidad	Guayabo	Gigante Neiva		Alluvial to fluvial (Guayabo)	550 m (1,800 ft) (Guayabo)	Overburden	
2.6	Pliocene		Pliocene volcanism Andean orogeny 3 GABI	Guayabo	Subachoque	Necesidad	Guayabo	Gigante Neiva		Alluvial to fluvial (Guayabo)	550 m (1,800 ft) (Guayabo)	Overburden	
5.3	Messinian		Andean orogeny 3 Foreland	Guayabo	Marichuela	Necesidad	Guayabo	Caimán	Honda	Alluvial to fluvial (Guayabo)	550 m (1,800 ft) (Guayabo)	Overburden	
13.5	Langhian		Regional flooding	León	hiatus	Caja	León	Caimán	Honda	Lacustrine (León)	400 m (1,300 ft) (León)	Seal	
16.2	Burdigalian		Miocene inundations Andean orogeny 2	C1	hiatus	Carbonera C1		Ospina	Honda	Proximal fluvio-deltaic (C1)	850 m (2,790 ft) (Carbonera)	Reservoir	
17.3	Burdigalian		Miocene inundations Andean orogeny 2	C2	hiatus	Carbonera C2		Ospina	Honda	Distal lacustrine-deltaic (C2)	850 m (2,790 ft) (Carbonera)	Seal	
19	Burdigalian		Miocene inundations Andean orogeny 2	C3	hiatus	Carbonera C3		Ospina	Honda	Proximal fluvio-deltaic (C3)	850 m (2,790 ft) (Carbonera)	Reservoir	
21	Early Miocene		Pebas wetlands	C4	hiatus	Carbonera C4		Ospina	Barzalosa	Distal fluvio-deltaic (C4)	850 m (2,790 ft) (Carbonera)	Seal	
23	Late Oligocene		Andean orogeny 1 Foredeep	C5	hiatus	Carbonera C5		Orito		Proximal fluvio-deltaic (C5)	850 m (2,790 ft) (Carbonera)	Reservoir	
25	Late Oligocene		Andean orogeny 1 Foredeep	C6	hiatus	Carbonera C6		Orito		Distal fluvio-lacustrine (C6)	850 m (2,790 ft) (Carbonera)	Seal	
28	Early Oligocene		Andean orogeny 1 Foredeep	C7	hiatus	C7		Pepino	Gualanday	Proximal deltaic-marine (C7)	850 m (2,790 ft) (Carbonera)	Reservoir	
32	Oligo-Eocene		Andean orogeny 1 Foredeep	C8	Usme	C8	onlap	Pepino	Gualanday	Marine-deltaic (C8)	850 m (2,790 ft) (Carbonera)	Seal; Source	
35	Late Eocene		Andean orogeny 1 Foredeep	Mirador	Usme	Mirador		Pepino	Gualanday	Coastal (Mirador)	240 m (790 ft) (Mirador)	Reservoir	
40	Middle Eocene		Andean orogeny 1 Foredeep	Mirador	Regadera	Mirador		Pepino	hiatus	Coastal (Mirador)	240 m (790 ft) (Mirador)	Reservoir	
45	Middle Eocene		Andean orogeny 1 Foredeep	Mirador	Regadera	Mirador		Pepino	hiatus	Coastal (Mirador)	240 m (790 ft) (Mirador)	Reservoir	
50	Early Eocene		Andean orogeny 1 Foredeep	Socha	Regadera	Los Cuervos		Pepino	hiatus	Deltaic (Los Cuervos)	260 m (850 ft) (Los Cuervos)	Seal; Source	
55	Late Paleocene		PETM; 2000 ppm CO_{2}	Los Cuervos	Bogotá	Los Cuervos		Pepino	Gualanday	Deltaic (Los Cuervos)	260 m (850 ft) (Los Cuervos)	Seal; Source	
60	Early Paleocene		SALMA	Barco	Guaduas	Barco		Rumiyaco	Gualanday	Fluvial (Barco)	225 m (738 ft) (Barco)	Reservoir	
65	Maastrichtian		KT extinction	Catatumbo	Guadalupe			Rumiyaco	Monserrate	Deltaic-fluvial (Guadalupe)	750 m (2,460 ft) (Guadalupe)	Reservoir	
72	Campanian		End of rifting	Colón-Mito Juan	Guadalupe			Rumiyaco	Monserrate	Deltaic-fluvial (Guadalupe)	750 m (2,460 ft) (Guadalupe)	Reservoir	
83	Santonian		End of rifting	Colón-Mito Juan	Guadalupe			Villeta/Güagüaquí		Deltaic-fluvial (Guadalupe)	750 m (2,460 ft) (Guadalupe)	Reservoir	
86	Coniacian		End of rifting	Colón-Mito Juan	Guadalupe			Villeta/Güagüaquí		Deltaic-fluvial (Guadalupe)	750 m (2,460 ft) (Guadalupe)	Reservoir	
89	Turonian		Cenomanian-Turonian anoxic event	La Luna	Chipaque	Gachetá	hiatus	Villeta/Güagüaquí		Restricted marine (all)	500 m (1,600 ft) (Gachetá)	Source	
93	Cenomanian		Rift 2	La Luna	Chipaque	Gachetá	hiatus	Villeta/Güagüaquí		Restricted marine (all)	500 m (1,600 ft) (Gachetá)	Source	
100	Albian		Rift 2	La Luna	Une	Une	hiatus	Caballos		Deltaic (Une)	500 m (1,600 ft) (Une)	Reservoir	
113	Aptian		Rift 2	Capacho	Fómeque	Une	hiatus	Motema	Yaví	Open marine (Fómeque)	800 m (2,600 ft) (Fómeque)	Source (Fóm)	
125	Barremian		High biodiversity	Aguardiente	Paja	Une	hiatus	Motema	Yaví	Shallow to open marine (Paja)	940 m (3,080 ft) (Paja)	Reservoir	
129	Hauterivian		Rift 1	Tibú- Mercedes	Las Juntas	hiatus	hiatus	Motema	Yaví	Deltaic (Las Juntas)	910 m (2,990 ft) (Las Juntas)	Reservoir (LJun)	
133	Valanginian		Rift 1	Río Negro	Cáqueza; Macanal; Rosablanca	hiatus	hiatus	Motema	Yaví	Restricted marine (Macanal)	2,935 m (9,629 ft) (Macanal)	Source (Mac)	
140	Berriasian		Rift 1	Girón	Cáqueza; Macanal; Rosablanca	hiatus	hiatus	Motema	Yaví	Restricted marine (Macanal)	2,935 m (9,629 ft) (Macanal)	Source (Mac)	
145	Tithonian		Break-up of Pangea	Jordán	Arcabuco	Buenavista Batá	hiatus	Saldaña		Alluvial, fluvial (Buenavista)	110 m (360 ft) (Buenavista)	"Jurassic"	
150	Early-Mid Jurassic		Passive margin 2	La Quinta	Montebel Noreán	hiatus	hiatus	Saldaña		Coastal tuff (La Quinta)	100 m (330 ft) (La Quinta)	"Jurassic"	
201	Late Triassic		Passive margin 2	Mucuchachi	Montebel Noreán	hiatus	hiatus	Payandé				"Jurassic"	
235	Early Triassic		Pangea		hiatus	hiatus	hiatus					"Paleozoic"	
250	Permian		Pangea		hiatus	hiatus	hiatus					"Paleozoic"	
300	Late Carboniferous		Famatinian orogeny		hiatus	hiatus	hiatus		Cerro Neiva ()			"Paleozoic"	
340	Early Carboniferous		Fossil fish Romer's gap		Cuche (355-385)	Farallones ()			Cerro Neiva ()	Deltaic, estuarine (Cuche)	900 m (3,000 ft) (Cuche)	"Paleozoic"	
360	Late Devonian		Passive margin 1	Río Cachirí (360-419)	Cuche (355-385)	Farallones ()			Ambicá ()	Alluvial-fluvial-reef (Farallones)	2,400 m (7,900 ft) (Farallones)	"Paleozoic"	
390	Early Devonian		High biodiversity	Floresta (387-400) El Tíbet					Ambicá ()	Shallow marine (Floresta)	600 m (2,000 ft) (Floresta)	"Paleozoic"	
410	Late Silurian		Silurian mystery	Floresta (387-400) El Tíbet								"Paleozoic"	
425	Early Silurian		Silurian mystery	hiatus								"Paleozoic"	
440	Late Ordovician		Rich fauna in Bolivia	San Pedro (450-490)		Duda ()						"Paleozoic"	
470	Early Ordovician		First fossils	San Pedro (450-490)	Busbanzá (>470±22) Chuscales Otengá	Guape ()		Río Nevado ()	Hígado () Agua Blanca; Venado (470-475)			"Paleozoic"	
488	Late Cambrian		Regional intrusions	Chicamocha (490-515)	Quetame ()	Ariarí ()		SJ del Guaviare (490-590)	San Isidro ()			"Paleozoic"	
515	Early Cambrian		Cambrian explosion		Quetame ()			SJ del Guaviare (490-590)	San Isidro ()			"Paleozoic"	
542	Ediacaran		Break-up of Rodinia		pre-Quetame		post-Parguaza	SJ del Guaviare (490-590)	El Barro ()	Yellow: allochthonous basement (Chibcha terrane); Green: autochthonous basement (Río Negro-Juruena Province)		Basement	
600	Neoproterozoic		Cariri Velhos orogeny	Bucaramanga (600-1400)	pre-Quetame		post-Parguaza	pre-Guaviare	El Barro ()	Yellow: allochthonous basement (Chibcha terrane); Green: autochthonous basement (Río Negro-Juruena Province)		Basement	
800	Neoproterozoic		Snowball Earth	Bucaramanga (600-1400)	pre-Quetame		post-Parguaza	pre-Guaviare	El Barro ()	Yellow: allochthonous basement (Chibcha terrane); Green: autochthonous basement (Río Negro-Juruena Province)		Basement	
1000	Mesoproterozoic		Sunsás orogeny	Bucaramanga (600-1400)	pre-Quetame	Ariarí (1000)	post-Parguaza	pre-Guaviare	La Urraca (1030-1100)	Yellow: allochthonous basement (Chibcha terrane); Green: autochthonous basement (Río Negro-Juruena Province)		Basement	
1300	Mesoproterozoic		Rondônia-Juruá orogeny	Bucaramanga (600-1400)	pre-Quetame	pre-Ariarí	Parguaza (1300-1400)	pre-Guaviare	Garzón (1180-1550)	Yellow: allochthonous basement (Chibcha terrane); Green: autochthonous basement (Río Negro-Juruena Province)		Basement	
1400	Mesoproterozoic		Rondônia-Juruá orogeny	pre-Bucaramanga	pre-Quetame	pre-Ariarí		pre-Guaviare	Garzón (1180-1550)	Yellow: allochthonous basement (Chibcha terrane); Green: autochthonous basement (Río Negro-Juruena Province)		Basement	
1600	Paleoproterozoic		Rondônia-Juruá orogeny	pre-Bucaramanga	pre-Quetame	pre-Ariarí	Maimachi (1500-1700)	pre-Guaviare	pre-Garzón	Yellow: allochthonous basement (Chibcha terrane); Green: autochthonous basement (Río Negro-Juruena Province)		Basement	
1800	Paleoproterozoic		Tapajós orogeny	pre-Bucaramanga	pre-Quetame	pre-Ariarí	Mitú (1800)	pre-Guaviare	pre-Garzón	Yellow: allochthonous basement (Chibcha terrane); Green: autochthonous basement (Río Negro-Juruena Province)		Basement	
1950	Paleoproterozoic		Transamazonic orogeny	pre-Bucaramanga	pre-Quetame	pre-Ariarí	pre-Mitú	pre-Guaviare	pre-Garzón	Yellow: allochthonous basement (Chibcha terrane); Green: autochthonous basement (Río Negro-Juruena Province)		Basement	
2200	Paleoproterozoic		Columbia	pre-Bucaramanga	pre-Quetame	pre-Ariarí	pre-Mitú	pre-Guaviare	pre-Garzón	Yellow: allochthonous basement (Chibcha terrane); Green: autochthonous basement (Río Negro-Juruena Province)		Basement	
2530	Archean		Carajas-Imataca orogeny	pre-Bucaramanga	pre-Quetame	pre-Ariarí	pre-Mitú	pre-Guaviare	pre-Garzón	Yellow: allochthonous basement (Chibcha terrane); Green: autochthonous basement (Río Negro-Juruena Province)		Basement	
3100	Archean		Kenorland	pre-Bucaramanga	pre-Quetame	pre-Ariarí	pre-Mitú	pre-Guaviare	pre-Garzón	Yellow: allochthonous basement (Chibcha terrane); Green: autochthonous basement (Río Negro-Juruena Province)		Basement	

Legend

- group
- important formation
- fossiliferous formation
- minor formation
- (age in Ma)
- proximal Llanos (Medina) (Note: based on Duarte et al. (2019), García González et al. (2009), and geological report of Villavicencio)
- distal Llanos (Saltarin 1A well) (Note: based on Duarte et al. (2019) and the hydrocarbon potential evaluation performed by the UIS and ANH in 2009)

== See also ==
Geology of the Eastern Hills
Geology of the Ocetá Páramo
Geology of the Altiplano Cundiboyacense

== Notes and references ==
=== Bibliography ===
- Acosta Garay, Jorge E.; Ulloa Melo, Carlos E. (2002), Mapa Geológico del Departamento de Cundinamarca - 1:250,000 - Memoria explicativa, INGEOMINAS, pp. 1–108
- ANM (2015), Esmeralda, ANM, pp. 1–2
- García González, Mario; Mier Umaña, Ricardo; Cruz Guevara, Luis Enrique; Vásquez, Mauricio (2009), Informe Ejecutivo - evaluación del potencial hidrocarburífero de las cuencas colombianas, Universidad Industrial de Santander, pp. 1–219
- Montaña Cárdenas, Jorge Hernando (2015), Análisis de deformaciones y modelo estructural del frente de deformación del Piedemonte Llanero de la Cordillera Oriental de Colombia (MSc. thesis) (PDF), Universidad Nacional de Colombia, pp. 1–57
- Patiño, Alejandro; Fuquen, Jaime; Ramos, Julián; Pedraza, Andrea; Ceballos, Leonardo; Pinzón, Lyda; Jerónimo, Yadira; Álvarez, Leidy; Torres, Andrea (2011), Cartografía geológica de la Plancha 247 - Cáqueza - 1:100,000 (PDF), INGEOMINAS, pp. 1–131, archived from the original (PDF) on 2017-08-15
- Pinto Valderrama, Jorge Eduardo; Mora Ortiz, José Pedro; Reátiga Tarazona, Gloria; Rey Pilonieta, Jorge Alberto; Toloza Hormiga, Silvia Johana; Torres Coronado, Diego Andrés; Vargas Mojica, David Ricardo; Zafra Manrique, Cristian Julián (2010), Geología del Piedemonte Llanero en la Cordillera Oriental, departamentos de Arauca y Casanare (PDF), INGEOMINAS & Universidad Industrial de Santander, pp. 1–64, archived from the original (PDF) on 2017-08-15
- Piraquive, Alejandro; Díaz, Juan Sebastián; Cuéllar, Tomas; Pardo, Germán; Kammer, Andreas (2011), "Reactivación Neógena de estructuras de rift del Cretácico Temprano asociadas con la Falla de Chámeza, Pajarito, Boyacá (Colombia): evidencias tectónicas y bioestratigráficas" (PDF), Geología Colombiana, 36: 197–216, archived from the original (PDF) on 2017-03-30
- Rodríguez Parra, Antonio José; Solano Silva, Orlando (2000), Mapa Geológico del Departamento de Boyacá - 1:250,000 - Memoria explicativa, INGEOMINAS, pp. 1–120
- Schütz, Christian (2012), Combined structural and Petroleum Systems Modeling in the Eastern Cordillera Basin, Colombia (MSc. thesis), Rheinisch-Westfälische Technische Hochschule Aachen & Instituto Colombiano del Petróleo, pp. 1–161
- Terraza, Roberto; Montoya, Diana; Reyes, Germán; Moreno, Giovanni; Fúquen, Jaime (2008), Geología del cinturón esmeraldífero oriental - Planchas 210, 228 & 229 - Guateque, Bogotá Noreste & Gachalá - 1:100,000 (PDF), INGEOMINAS, pp. 1–126
- Terraza, Roberto; Montoya, Diana; Reyes, Germán; Moreno, Giovanni; Fúquen, Jaime; Torres Jaimes, Eliana; López Cardona, Myriam; Nivia Guevara, Álvaro; Etayo Serna, Fernando (2013), Geología de la Plancha 229 - Gachalá - 1:100,000 (PDF), Servicio Geológico Colombiano, pp. 1–296, archived from the original (PDF) on 2017-08-06
- Uribe, Sylvano E (1960), "Las esmeraldas de Colombia" [The emeralds from Colombia] (PDF), Boletín de la Sociedad Geográfica de Colombia, 65 (in Spanish), XVIII: 1–8
- Villamil, Tomas (2012), Chronology Relative Sea Level History and a New Sequence Stratigraphic Model for Basinal Cretaceous Facies of Colombia, Society for Sedimentary Geology (SEPM), pp. 161–216

==== Maps ====
- Ulloa, Carlos E.; Guerra, Álvaro; Escovar, Ricardo (1998), Plancha 172 - Paz de Río - 1:100,000, INGEOMINAS, p. 1
- Ulloa, Carlos E.; Rodríguez, Erasmo; Escovar, Ricardo (1998), Plancha 192 - Laguna de Tota - 1:100,000, INGEOMINAS, p. 1
- Renzoni, Giancarlo (1992), Plancha 193 - Yopal - 1:100,000, INGEOMINAS, p. 1
- Terraza, Roberto; Moreno, Giovanni; Buitrago, José A.; Pérez, Adrián; Montoya, Diana María (2010), Plancha 210 - Guateque - 1:100,000, INGEOMINAS, p. 1
- Ulloa, Carlos; Rodríguez, Erasmo (2009), Plancha 211 - Tauramena - 1:100,000, INGEOMINAS, p. 1
- Buitrago, José Alberto; Terraza M., Roberto; Etayo, Fernando (1998), Plancha 228 - Santafé de Bogotá Noreste - 1:100,000, INGEOMINAS, p. 1
- Pulido, Orlando; Gómez, Luz Stella; Marín, Pedro (1998), Plancha 266 - Villavicencio - 1:100,000, INGEOMINAS, p. 1
