= Pseudoosterella ubalaensis =

Pseudoosterella ubalaensis Temporal range: Valanginian, 135–133 Ma

Scientific classification
- Domain: Eukaryota
- Kingdom: Animalia
- Phylum: Mollusca
- Class: Cephalopoda
- Subclass: †Ammonoidea
- Order: †Ammonitida
- Family: †Oosterellidae
- Genus: †Pseudoosterella
- Species: †P. ubalaensis

Binomial name
- †Pseudoosterella ubalaensis Haas, 1960

Extinct species of mollusc

Pseudoosterella ubalaensis is an extinct ammonoid cephalopod species belonging to the genus Pseudoosterella in the family of Oosterellidae. These fast-moving nektonic carnivores lived during the Early Cretaceous; Valanginian epoch. The species was first described by Haas in 1960.

== Etymology ==
The species epithet is derived from Ubalá, Cundinamarca, where the species has been found. In Muysccubun, the language of the Muisca, Ubalá means "Place on the hillside" or "At the foot of the hillside".

== Distribution ==
Fossils of Pseudoosterella ubalaensis have been found in Valanginian black shales of the Murca Formation, belonging to the Cáqueza Group, outcropping near Ubalá, and Labranzagrande, Boyacá.

== See also ==
- List of flora and fauna named after the Muisca
