= Asunción arch =

Geologic formation in Paraguay and northern Argentina

Coordinates: 24.464476°S 57.327553°W

The Asunción arch (Spanish: Arco de Asunción) is a basement high in Paraguay and nearby areas of Argentina that makes up the modern western boundary of Paraná Basin. Asunción arch is thought to be a forebulge developed as result of the piling up of material in Bolivia and the Argentine Northwest during the Andean orogeny in the Cenozoic Era.

Along Paraguay Asunción arch has a north–south direction parallel to Paraguay River. To the south of Paraguay Asunción arch runs in a S-SW direction and be traced no further south than to Corrientes Province. A flatter and broader second branch of the Asunción arch runs from southern Paraguay the SE linking up with Río Grande arch in Brazil.
