= Murca Formation =

Geologic formation in Colombia

- Stratigraphic range: Late Valanginian; ~135–133 Ma
- Type: Geological formation
- Unit of: Cáqueza Group
- Underlies: La Naveta Fm., Trincheras Fm., Útica Fm.
- Overlies: not observed
- Thickness: up to 924 m (3,031 ft)

Lithology
- Primary: Sandstone
- Other: Claystone, siltstone

Location
- Coordinates: 5°15′27″N 74°21′12″W
- Region: Altiplano Cundiboyacense; Eastern Ranges, Andes
- Country: Colombia

Type section
- Named for: Murca River
- Named by: Moreno
- Location: Pacho, El Peñón
- Year defined: 1990
- Coordinates: 5°15′27″N 74°21′12″W
- Region: Cundinamarca, Boyacá
- Country: Colombia

The Murca Formation (Spanish: Formación Murca, Kim) is a geological formation of the Altiplano Cundiboyacense, Eastern Ranges of the Colombian Andes. The predominantly subarkose sandstone with claystones and siltstones formation dates to the Early Cretaceous period; Valanginian epoch and has a maximum thickness of 924 metres (3,031 ft).

== Etymology ==
The formation was defined and named in 1990 by Moreno after the Murca River, Cundinamarca.

== Description ==
=== Lithologies ===
The Murca Formation has a maximum thickness of 924 metres (3,031 ft), and is characterised by a sequence of subarkose coarse-grained, locally cross-bedded sandstones with intercalating siltstones and claystones. The basal part of the black and grey feldspar bearing sandstone beds contains large pyrite crystals. The matrix is formed by cements of calcite, iron oxide, sericite and chlorite.

Fossils of Berriasella colombiana and Pseudoosterella ubalaensis have been found in the Murca Formation.

=== Stratigraphy and depositional environment ===
The Murca Formation, belonging to the Cáqueza Group, underlies the Trincheras Formation, lowermost unit of the Villeta Group. The contact with the underlying unit has not been observed. The age has been estimated to be Valanginian. Stratigraphically, the formation is time equivalent with the Cumbre, Rosablanca and Útica Formations. The formation has been deposited in a marine environment characterised by turbidites. A mid submarine fan and outer fan setting have been observed in the Murca Formation. A possible source for the sandstones were Precambrian sandstones, gneisses and granites, belonging to the Guiana Shield.

== Outcrops ==
Type locality of the Murca Formation to the northwest of the Bogotá savanna

The Murca Formation is apart from its type locality, found near Nimaima and Guayabal in the western flank and Ubalá and Labranzagrande in the eastern flank of the Eastern Ranges.

== See also ==
Geology of the Eastern Hills
Geology of the Ocetá Páramo
Geology of the Altiplano Cundiboyacense
