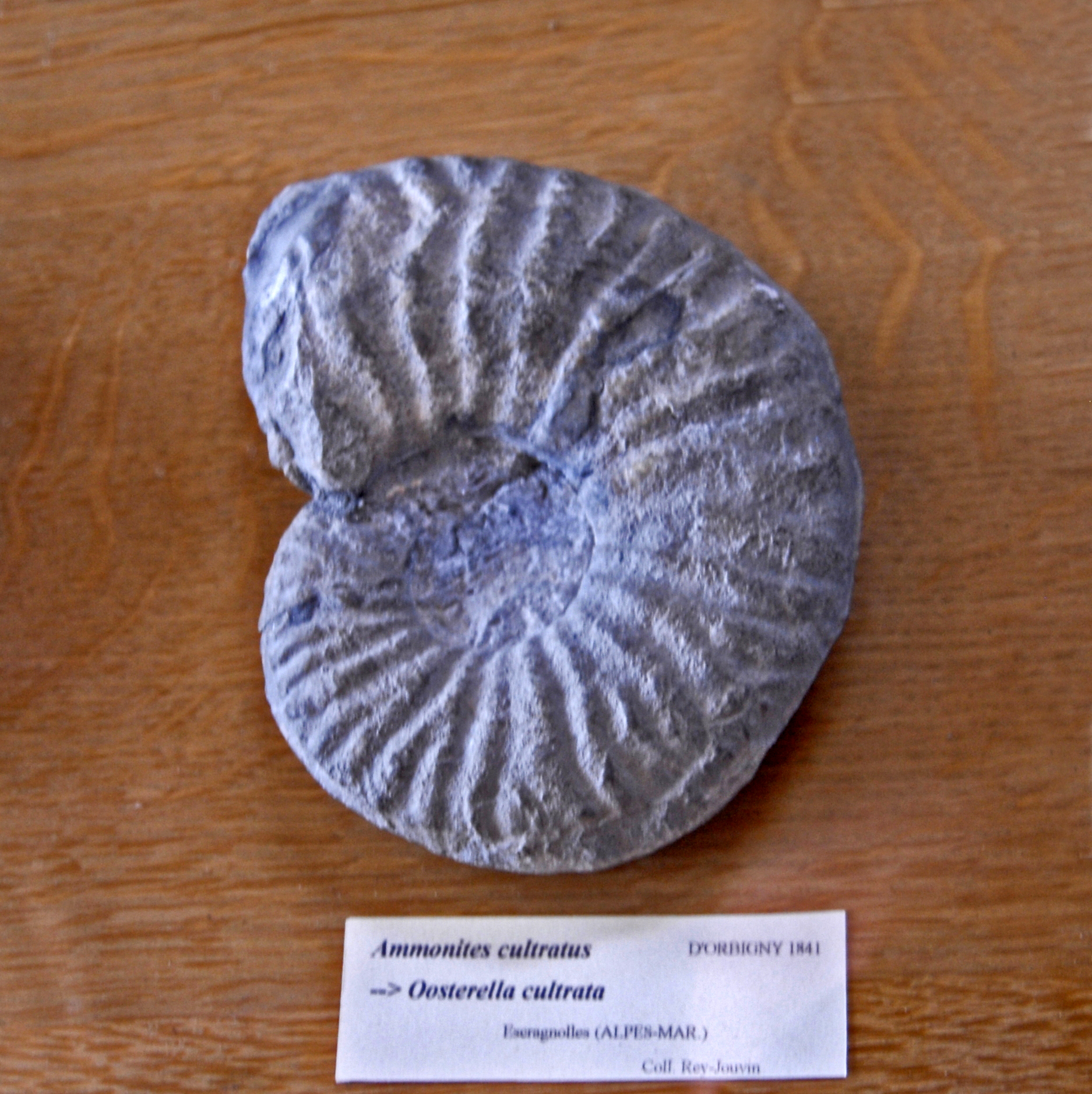
- Fossil of Oosterella cultratus from Maritime Alps, on display at Galerie de paléontologie et d'anatomie comparée in Paris

Scientific classification
- Kingdom: Animalia
- Phylum: Mollusca
- Class: Cephalopoda
- Subclass: †Ammonoidea
- Order: †Ammonitida
- Family: †Oosterellidae
- Genus: †Oosterella; Kilian, 1911

= Oosterella =

Oosterella Temporal range: Cretaceous, 140.2–130.0 Ma

Genus of molluscs (fossil)

Oosterella is an extinct ammonoid cephalopod genus belonging to the family Oosterellidae. These fast-moving nektonic carnivores lived during the Cretaceous, from the upper Valanginian age to the lower Hauterivian age.

== Species ==
- Oosterella colombiana Haas, 1960
- Oosterella cultratus d'Orbigny, 1841
- Oosterella ondulata Reboulet, 1996
- Oosterella vilanovae Nicklas, 1892

== Distribution ==
Fossils of species within this genus have been found in the Cretaceous sediments of Argentina, Austria, Colombia, Czech Republic, France, Hungary, Italy, Mexico, Morocco, Romania and Slovakia.
