= Andean orogeny =

Ongoing mountain-forming process in South America

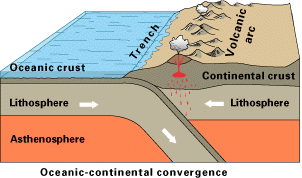
Simplified sketch of the present-situation along most of the Andes

The Andean orogeny (Spanish: Orogenia andina) is an ongoing process of orogeny that began in the Early Jurassic and is responsible for the rise of the Andes mountains. The orogeny is driven by a reactivation of a long-lived subduction system along the western margin of South America. On a continental scale the Cretaceous (90 Ma) and Oligocene (30 Ma) were periods of re-arrangements in the orogeny. The details of the orogeny vary depending on the segment and the geological period considered.

== Overview ==
Subduction orogeny has been occurring in what is now western South America since the break-up of the supercontinent Rodinia in the Neoproterozoic. The Paleozoic Pampean, Famatinian and Gondwanan orogenies are the immediate precursors to the later Andean orogeny. The first phases of Andean orogeny in the Jurassic and Early Cretaceous were characterized by extensional tectonics, rifting, the development of back-arc basins and the emplacement of large batholiths. This development is presumed to have been linked to the subduction of cold oceanic lithosphere. During the mid to Late Cretaceous (ca. 90 million years ago) the Andean orogeny changed significantly in character. Warmer and younger oceanic lithosphere is believed to have started to be subducted beneath South America around this time. Such kind of subduction is held responsible not only for the intense contractional deformation that different lithologies were subject to, but also the uplift and erosion known to have occurred from the Late Cretaceous onward. Plate tectonic reorganization since the mid-Cretaceous might also have been linked to the opening of the South Atlantic Ocean. Another change related to mid-Cretaceous plate tectonic changes was the change of subduction direction of the oceanic lithosphere that went from having south-east motion to having a north-east motion at about 90 million years ago. While subduction direction changed it remained oblique (and not perpendicular) to the coast of South America, and the direction change affected several subduction zone-parallel faults including Atacama, Domeyko and Liquiñe-Ofqui.

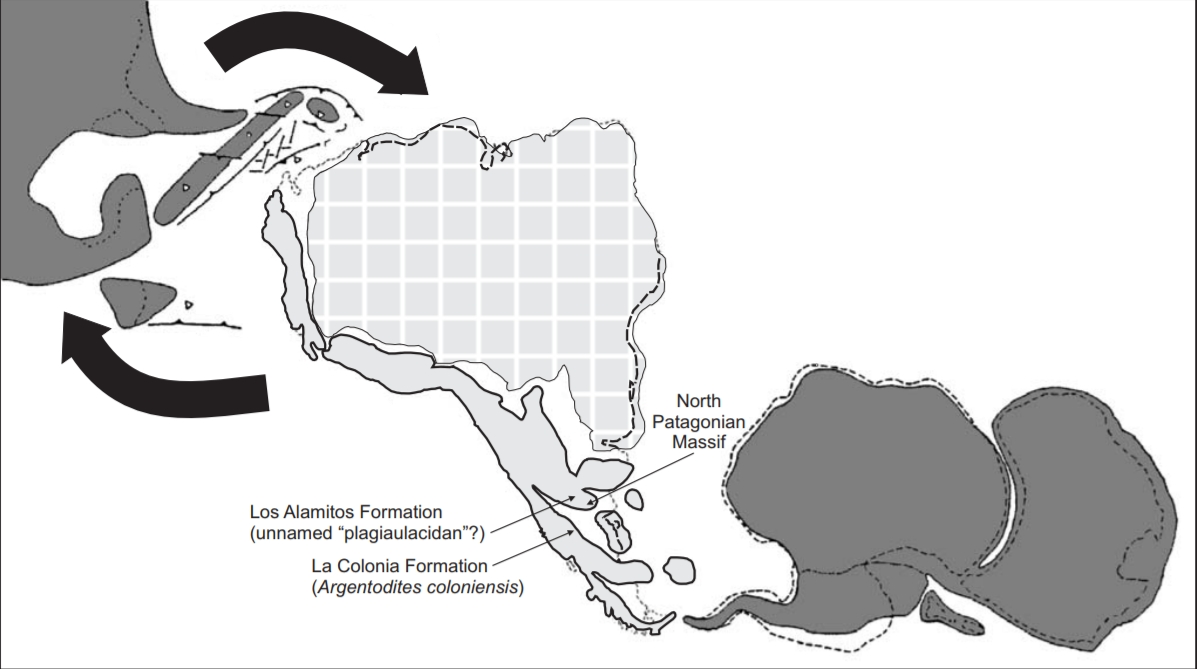
Paleogeography of the Late Cretaceous South America. Areas subject to the Andean orogeny are shown in light grey while the stable cratons are shown as grey squares. The sedimentary formations of Los Alamitos and La Colonia that formed in the Late Cretaceous are indicated.

Low angle subduction or flat-slab subduction has been common during the Andean orogeny leading to crustal shortening and deformation and the suppression of arc volcanism. Flat-slab subduction has occurred at different times in various part of the Andes, with northern Colombia (6–10° N), Ecuador (0–2° S), northern Peru (3–13° S) and north-central Chile (24–30° S) experiencing these conditions at present.

The tectonic growth of the Andes and the regional climate have evolved simultaneously and have influenced each other. The topographic barrier formed by the Andes stopped the income of humid air into the present Atacama desert. This aridity, in turn, changed the normal superficial redistribution of mass via erosion and river transport, modifying the later tectonic deformation. The lack of sediment in the trench to lubricate the subducting plate allows for intense deformation and erosion of the lower crust. The removal of the lower part of the upper plate causes localized extensional tectonics due to gravitational collapse of the upper crust, evident by normal faulting in the forearc.

In the Oligocene the Farallon Plate broke up, forming the modern Cocos and Nazca plates ushering a series of changes in the Andean orogeny. The new Nazca Plate was then directed into an orthogonal subduction with South America causing ever-since uplift in the Andes, but causing most impact in the Miocene. While the various segments of the Andes have their own uplift histories, as a whole the Andes have risen significantly in last 30 million years (Oligocene–present).

== Orogeny by segment ==
=== Colombia, Ecuador and Venezuela (12° N–3° S) ===
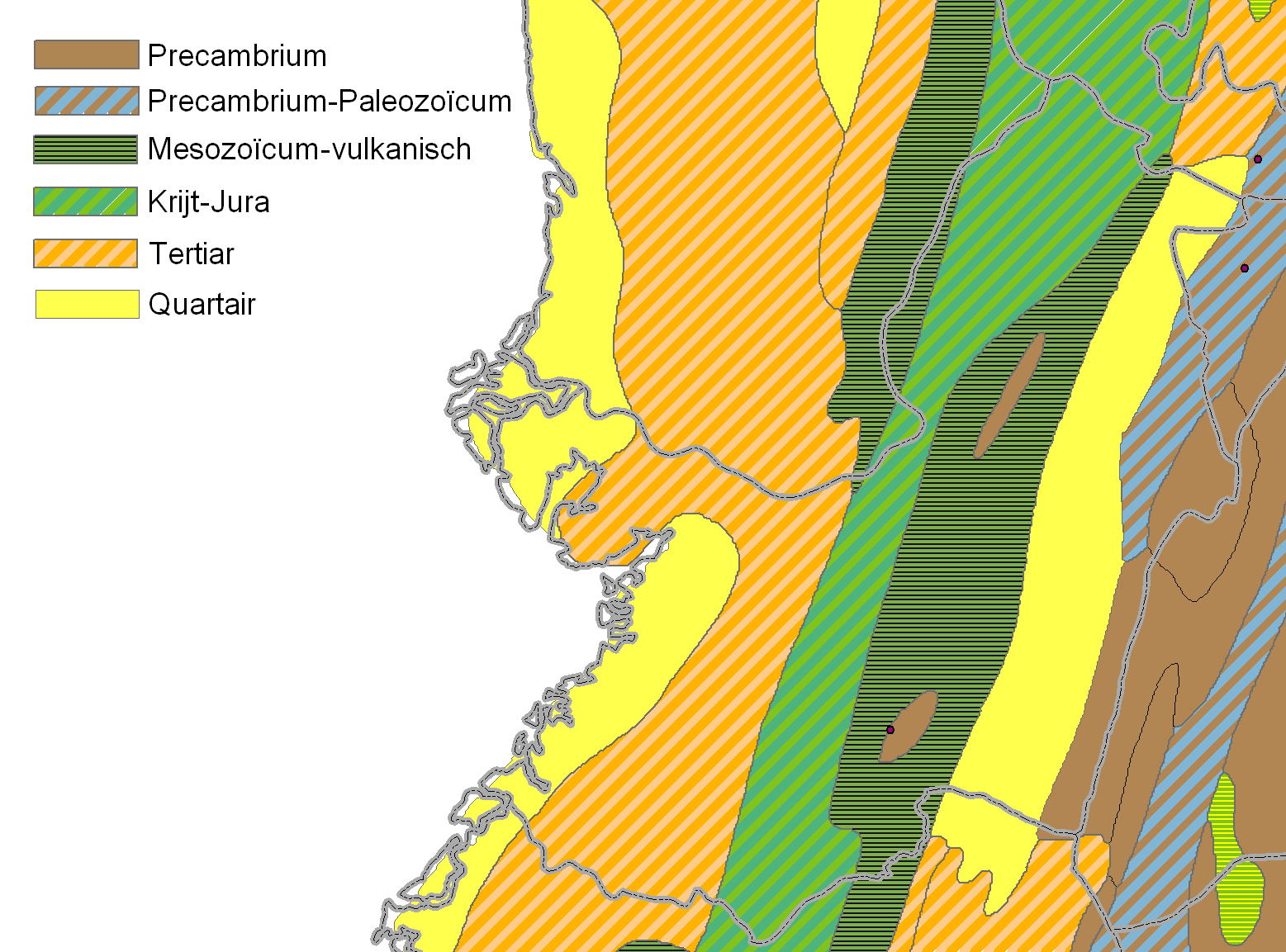
Map of a north-south sea-parallel pattern of rock ages in western Colombia. This pattern is a result of the Andean orogeny.

Tectonic blocks of continental crust that had separated from northwestern South America in the Jurassic re-joined the continent in the Late Cretaceous by colliding obliquely with it. This episode of accretion occurred in a complex sequence. The accretion of the island arcs against northwestern South America in the Early Cretaceous led to the development of a magmatic arc caused by subduction. The Romeral Fault in Colombia forms the suture between the accreted terranes and the rest of South America. Around the Cretaceous–Paleogene boundary (ca. 65 million years ago) the oceanic plateau of the Caribbean large igneous province collided with South America. The subduction of the lithosphere as the oceanic plateau approached South America led to the formation of a magmatic arc now preserved in the Cordillera Real of Ecuador and the Cordillera Central of Colombia. In the Miocene an island arc and terrane (Chocó terrane) collided against northwestern South America. This terrane forms parts of what is now Chocó Department and Western Panama.

The Caribbean Plate collided with South America in the Early Cenozoic but shifted then its movement eastward. Dextral fault movement between the South American and Caribbean plate started 17–15 million years ago. This movement was canalized along a series of strike-slip faults, but these faults alone do not account for all deformation. The northern part of the Dolores-Guayaquil Megashear forms part of the dextral fault systems while in the south the megashear runs along the suture between the accreted tectonic blocks and the rest of South America.

=== Northern Peru (3–13° S) ===
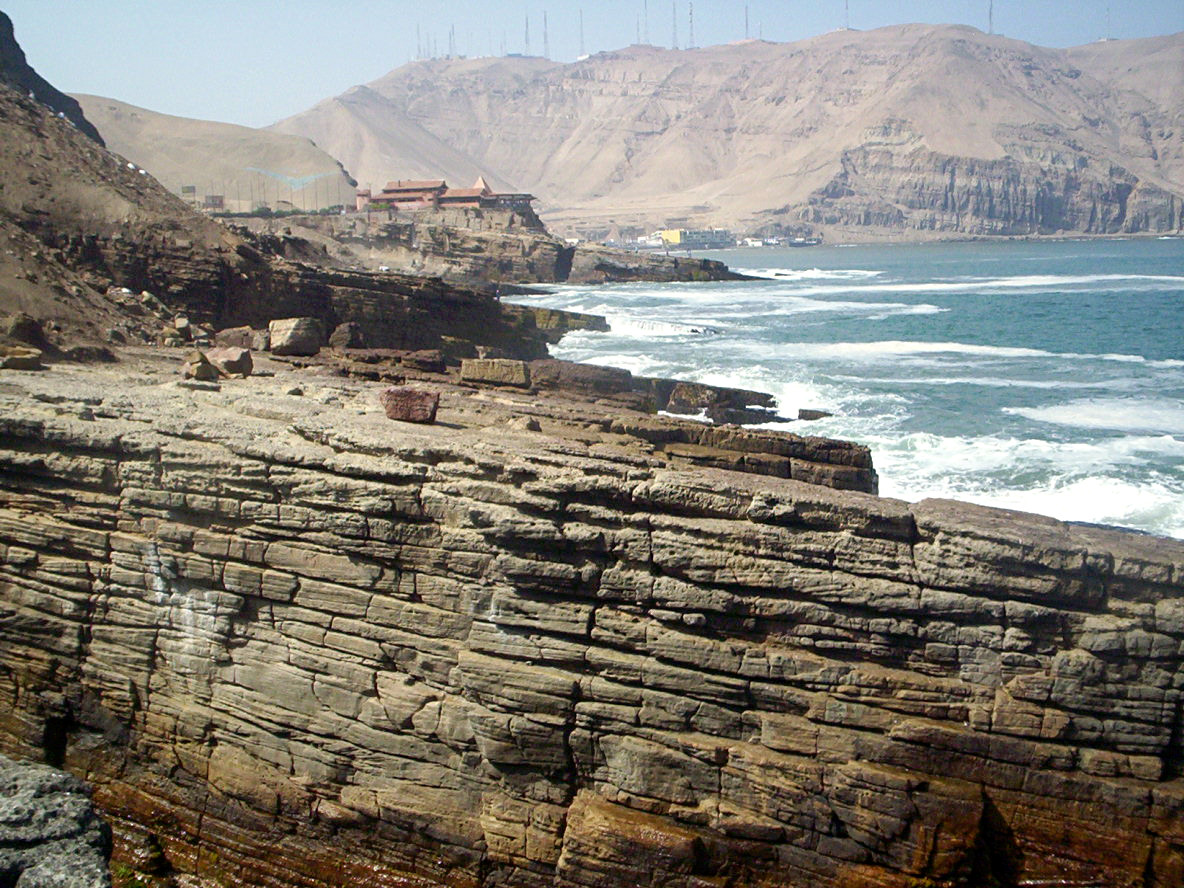
The seaward tilting of the sedimentary strata of Salto del Fraile Formation in Peru was caused by the Andean orogeny.

Long before the Andean orogeny the northern half of Peru was subject of the accretion of terranes in the Neoproterozoic and Paleozoic. Andean orogenic deformation in northern Peru can be traced to the Albian (Early Cretaceous). This first phase of deformation —the Mochica Phase (Note: The Mochica Phase and the other phases in Peru were named by Gustav Steinmann (1856–1929) who established the first chronology of structural events in central Peru.)— is evidenced in the folding of Casma Group sediments near the coast.

Sedimentary basins in western Peru changed from marine to continental conditions in the Late Cretaceous as a consequence of a generalized vertical uplift. The uplift in northern Peru is thought to be associated with the contemporary accretion of the Piñón terrane in Ecuador. This stage of orogeny is called the Peruvian Phase. Besides coastal Peru the Peruvian Phase affected or caused crustal shortening along the Cordillera Oriental and the tectonic inversion of Santiago Basin in the Sub-Andean zone. The bulk of the Sub-Andean zone was however unaffected by the Peruvian Phase.

After a period without much tectonic activity in the Early Eocene the Incaic Phase of orogeny occurred in the Mid and Late Eocene. No other tectonic event in the western Peruvian Andes compare with the Incaic Phase in magnitude. Horizontal shortening during the Incaic Phase resulted in the formation of the Marañón fold and thrust belt. An unconformity cutting across the Marañón fold and thrust belt show the Incaic Phase ended no later than 33 million years ago in the earliest Oligocene.

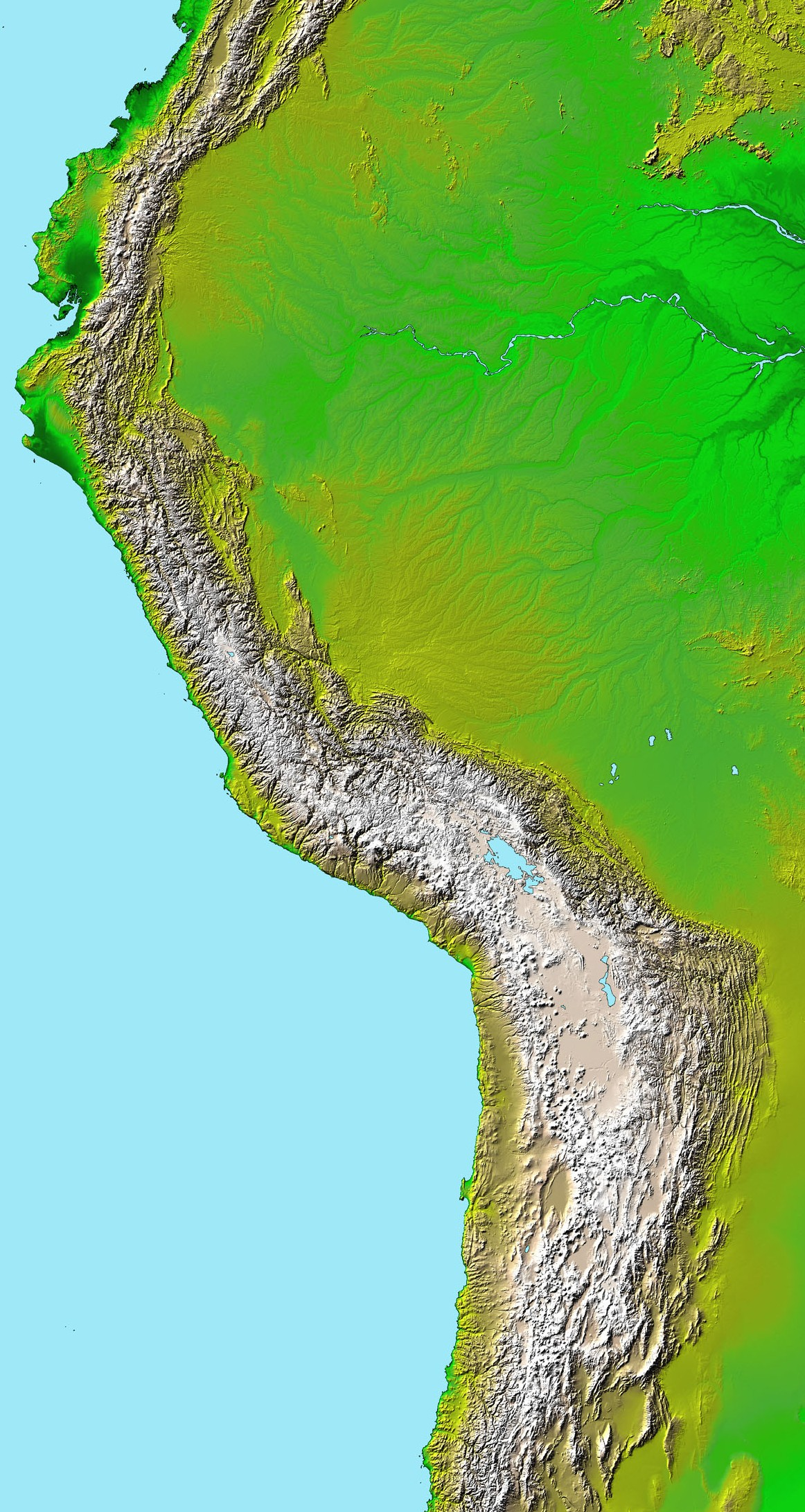
Topographic map of the Andes by the NASA. The southern and northern ends of the Andes are not shown. The Bolivian Orocline is visible as a bend in the coastline and the Andes lower half of the map.

In the period after the Eocene the Northern Peruvian Andes were subject to the Quechua Phase of orogeny. The Quechua Phase is divided into the sub-phases Quechua 1, Quechua 2 and Quechua 3. (Note: The validity in of this subdivision to describe the latest Andean orogeny in Peru has been questioned considering that deformation could have been continuous and migrating along the Andes.) The Quechua 1 Phase lasted from 17 to 15 million years ago and included a reactivation of Inca Phase structures in the Cordillera Occidental. (Note: The Quechua 1 Phase did also affect southern Peru and the Cordillera Oriental of Ecuador.) 9–8 million years ago, in the Quechua 2 Phase, the older parts of the Andes in northern Peru were thrusted to the northeast. Most of the Sub-Andean zone of northern Peru deformed 7–5 million years ago (Late Miocene) during the Quechua 3 Phase. The Sub-Andean stacked in a thrust belt.

The Miocene rise of the Andes in Peru and Ecuador led to increased orographic precipitation along its eastern parts and to the birth of the modern Amazon River. One hypothesis links these two changes by assuming that increased precipitation led to increased erosion and this erosion led to filling the Andean foreland basins beyond their capacity and that it would have been the basin over-sedimentation rather than the rise of the Andes that made drainage basins flow to the east. Previously the interior of northern South America drained to the Pacific.

=== Bolivian Orocline (13–26° S) ===
Early Andean subduction in the Jurassic formed a volcanic arc in northern Chile known as La Negra Arc. (Note: A series of iron ore deposits in the northern Chilean Coast Range known as the Chilean Iron Belt are related to the magmatism of La Negra Arc.) The remnants of this arc are now exposed in the Chilean Coast Range. Several plutons were emplaced in the Chilean Coast Range in the Jurassic and Early Cretaceous including the Vicuña Mackenna Batholith. Further east at similar latitudes, in Argentina and Bolivia, the Salta rift system developed during the Late Jurassic and the Early Cretaceous. Salar de Atacama Basin, which is thought to be the western arm of the rift system, accumulated during the Late Cretaceous and Early Paleogene a >6,000 m thick pile of sediments now known as the Purilactis Group.

Pisco Basin, around latitude 14° S, was subject to a marine transgression in the Oligocene and Early Miocene epochs (25–16 Ma). In contrast Moquegua Basin to the southeast and the coast to south of Pisco Basin saw no transgression during this time but a steadily rise of the land.

From the Late Miocene onward the region that would become the Altiplano rose from low elevations to more than 3,000 m.a.s.l. It is estimated that the region rose 2000 to 3000 meters in the last ten million years. Together with this uplift several valleys incised in the western flank of the Altiplano. In the Miocene the Atacama Fault moved, uplifting the Chilean Coast Range and creating sedimentary basins east of it. At the same time the Andes around the Altiplano region broadened to exceed any other Andean segment in width. Possibly about 1000 km of lithosphere has been lost due to lithospheric shortening. During subduction the western end of the forearc region (Note: Northern Chile and the westernmost fringes of Bolivia.) flexured downward forming a giant monocline. Somewhat to the south, tectonic inversion belonging during the "Incaic Phase" (Eocene?) have tilted the strata of Purilactis Group and in some localities also thrust younger strata on top of it.

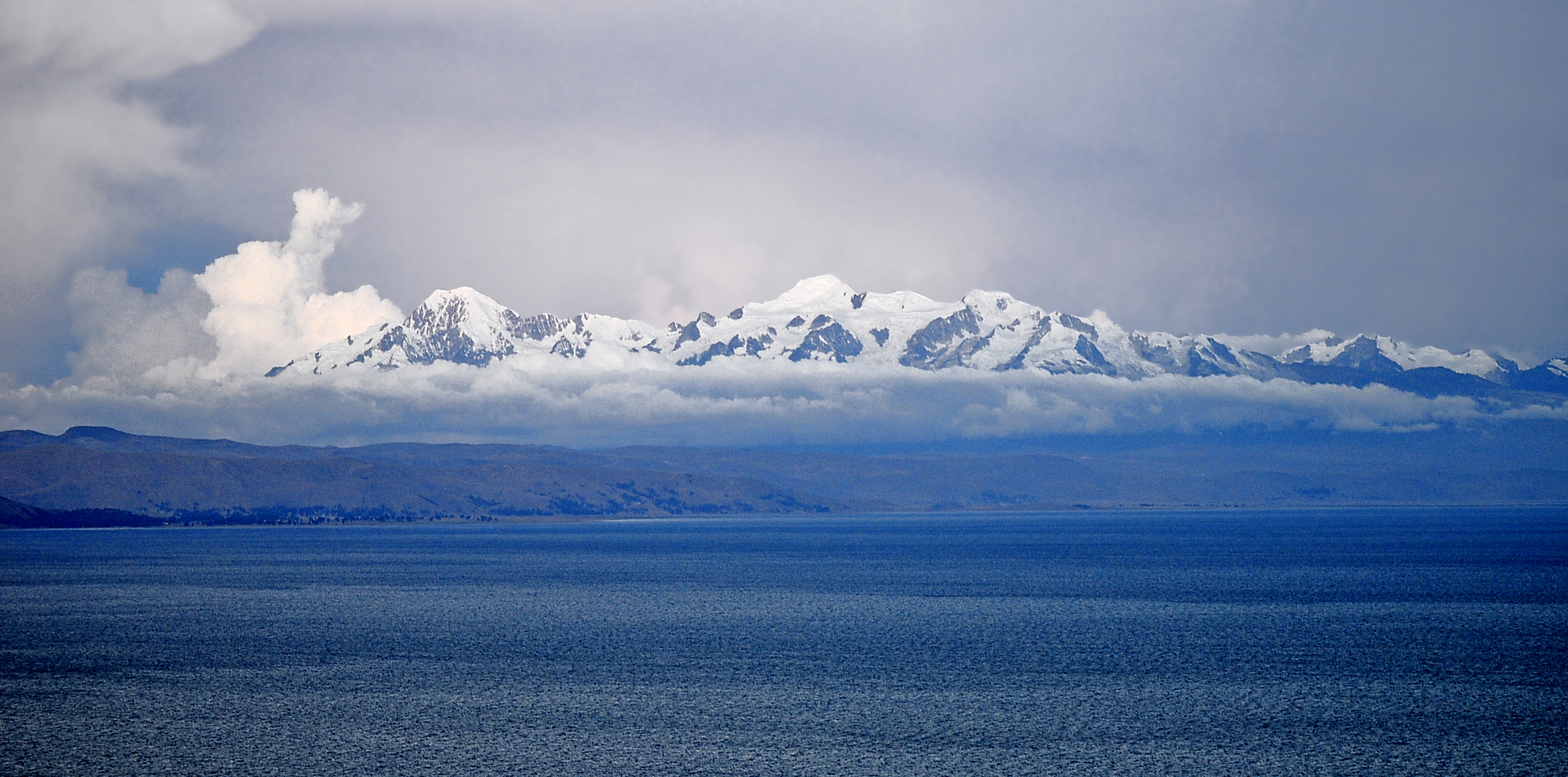
Situated between Lake Titicaca and the Cordillera Real in Bolivia, the Altiplano forms an extensive intermontane plateau whose uplift is one of the most striking features of the Andean orogeny.

The region east of the Altiplano is characterized by deformation and tectonics along a complex fold and thrust belt. Over-all the region surrounding the Altiplano and Puna plateaux has been horizontally shortened since the Eocene. In southern Bolivia lithospheric shortening has made the Andean foreland basin to move eastward relative to the continent at an average rate of ca. 12–20 mm per year during most of the Cenozoic. (Note: At least during the last 55 millions years.) Along the Argentine Northwest the Andean uplift has caused Andean foreland basins to separate into several minor isolated intermontane sedimentary basins. Towards the east the piling up of crust in Bolivia and the Argentine Norwest caused a north-south forebulge known as Asunción arch to develop in Paraguay.

The uplift of the Altiplano is thought to be indebted to a combination of horizontal shortening of the crust and to increased temperatures in the mantle (thermal thinning). The bend in the Andes and the west coast of South America known as the Bolivian Orocline was enhanced by Cenozoic horizontal shortening but existed already independently of it.

Meso-scale tectonic processes aside, the particular characteristics of the Bolivian Orocline–Altiplano region have been attributed to a variety of deeper causes. These causes include a local steepening of the subduction angle of Nazca Plate, increased crustal shortening and plate convergence between the Nazca and South American plates, an acceleration in the westward drift of the South American Plate, and a rise in the shear stress between the Nazca and South American plates. This increase in shear stress could in turn be related to the scarcity of sediments in the Atacama trench which is caused by the arid conditions along Atacama Desert. Capitanio et al. attributes the rise of Altiplano and the bending of the Bolivian Orocline to the varying ages of the subducted Nazca Plate with the older parts of the plate subducting at the centre of the orocline. As Andrés Tassara puts it the rigidity of the Bolivian Orocline crust is derivative of the thermal conditions. The crust of the western region (forearc) of the orocline has been cold and rigid, resisting and damming up the westward flow of warmer and weaker ductile crustal material from beneath the Altiplano.

The Cenozoic orogeny at the Bolivian orocline has produced a significant anatexis of crustal rocks including metasediments and gneisses resulting in the formation of peraluminous magmas. These characteristics imply that the Cenozoic tectonics and magmatism in parts of Bolivian Andes is similar to that seen in collisional orogens. The peralumineous magmatism in Cordillera Oriental is the cause of the world-class mineralizations of the Bolivian tin belt.

The rise of the Altiplano is thought by scientist Adrian Hartley to have enhanced an already prevailing aridity or semi-aridity in Atacama Desert by casting a rain shadow over the region.

=== Central Chile and Western Argentina (26–39° S) ===
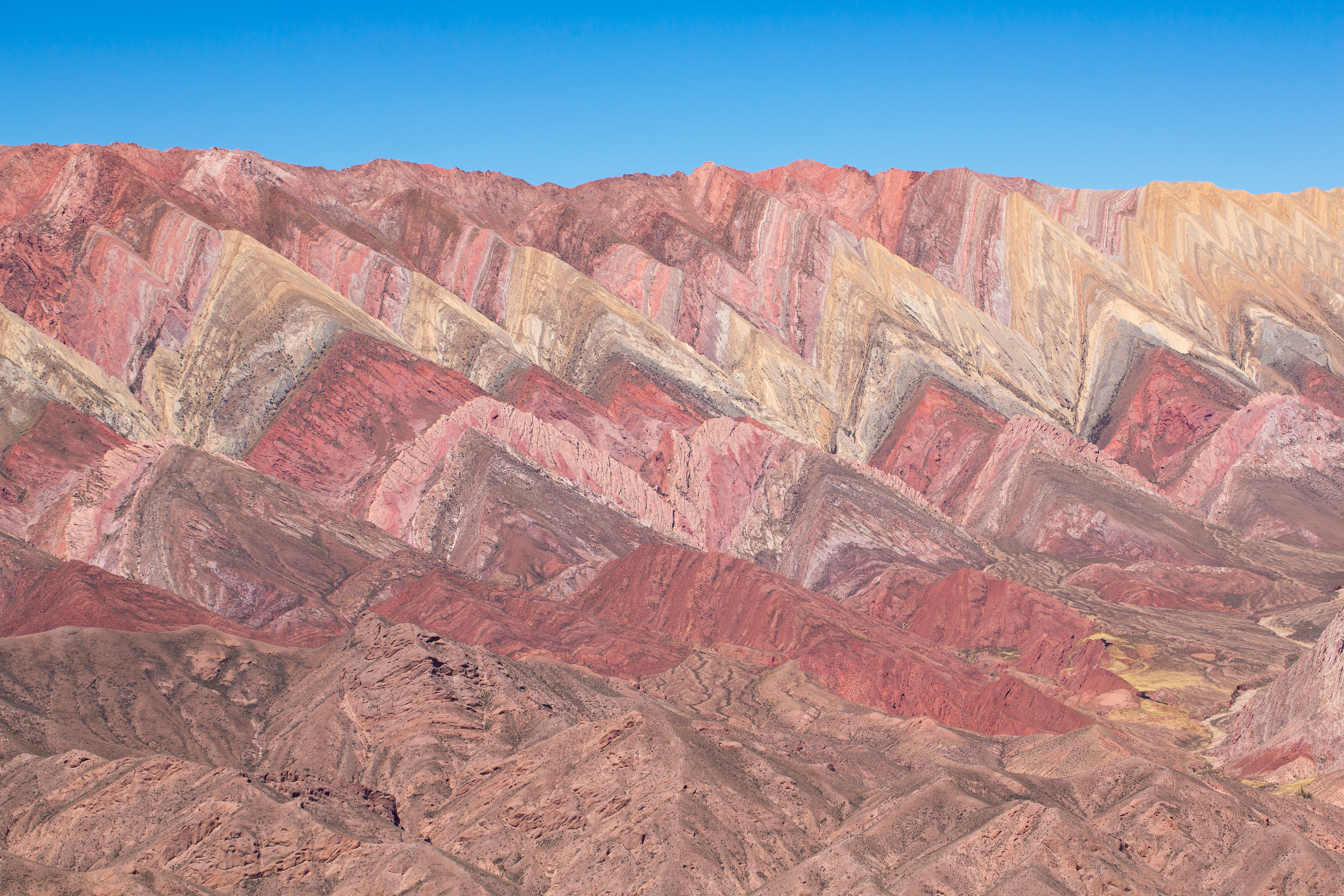
Tilted strata of the Yacoraite Formation at Serranía de Hornocal in northernmost Argentina. The Andean orogeny caused the tilting of these originally horizontal strata.

At the latitudes between 17 and 39° S the Late Cretaceous and Cenozoic development of the Andean orogeny is characterized by an eastward migration of the magmatic belt and the development of several foreland basins. The eastward migration of the arc is thought to be caused by subduction erosion.

At the latitudes of 32–36° S —that is Central Chile and most of Mendoza Province— the Andean orogeny proper began in the Late Cretaceous when backarc basins were inverted. Immediately east of the early Andes foreland basins developed and their flexural subsidence caused the ingression of waters from the Atlantic all the way to the front of the orogen in the Maastrichtian. The Andes at the latitudes of 32–36° S experienced a sequence of uplift in the Cenozoic that started in the west and spread to the east. Beginning about 20 million years ago in the Miocene the Principal Cordillera (east of Santiago) began an uplift that lasted until about 8 million years ago. From the Eocene to the early Miocene, sediments (Note: These sediments are grouped in the Abanico and Farellones Formation.) accumulated in the Abanico Extensional Basin, a north-south elongated basin in Chile that spanned from 29° to 38° S. Tectonic inversion from 21 to 16 million years ago made the basin to collapse and the sediments to be incorporated to the Andean cordillera. Lavas and volcanic material that are now part of Farellones Formation accumulated while the basin was being inverted and uplifted. The Miocene continental divide was about 20 km to the west of the modern water divide that makes up the Argentina–Chile border. Subsequent river incision shifted the divide to the east leaving old flattish surfaces hanging. Compression and uplift in this part of the Andes has continued into the present. The Principal Cordillera had risen to heights that allowed for the development of valley glaciers about 1 million years ago.

Before the Miocene uplift of the Principal Cordillera was over, the Frontal Cordillera to the east started a period of uplift that lasted from 12 to 5 million years ago. Further east the Precordillera was uplifted in the last 10 million years and the Sierras Pampeanas has experienced a similar uplift in the last 5 million years. The more eastern part of the Andes at these latitudes had their geometry controlled by ancient faults dating to the San Rafael orogeny of the Paleozoic. The Sierras de Córdoba (part of the Sierras Pampeanas) where the effects of the ancient Pampean orogeny can be observed, owes it modern uplift and relief to the Andean orogeny in the late Cenozoic. Similarly the San Rafael Block east of the Andes and south of Sierras Pampeanas was raised in the Miocene during the Andean orogeny. In broad terms the most active phase of orogeny in area of southern Mendoza Province and northern Neuquén Province (34–38° S) happened in the Late Miocene while arc volcanism occurred east of the Andes.

At more southern latitudes (36–39° S) various Jurassic and Cretaceous marine transgressions from the Pacific are recorded in the sediments of Neuquén Basin. (Note: These marine sediments belong to Cuyo Group, Tordillo Formation, Auquilco Formation and Vaca Muerta Formation.) In the Late Cretaceous conditions changed. A marine regression occurred and the fold and thrust belts of Malargüe (36°00 S), Chos Malal (37° S) and Agrio (38° S) started to develop in the Andes and did so in until Eocene times. This meant an advance of the orogenic deformation since the Late Cretaceous that caused the western part of Neuquén Basin to stack in the Malargüe and Agrio fold and thrust belts. In the Oligocene the western part of the fold and thrust belt was subject to a short period of extensional tectonics whose structures were inverted in the Miocene. (Note: This inversion is thought to have led to the closure of Cura-Mallín Basin as evidenced by structural studies of Loncopué Trough. However, evidence for Oligocene extension and rifting in the south-central Andes has been questioned.) After a period of quiescence the Agrio fold and thrust belt resumed limited activity in the Eocene and then again in the Late Miocene.

In the south of Mendoza Province the Guañacos fold and thrust belt (36.5° S) appeared and grew in the Pliocene and Pleistocene consuming the western fringes of the Neuquén Basin.

=== Southern Patagonian Andes (48–55° S) ===
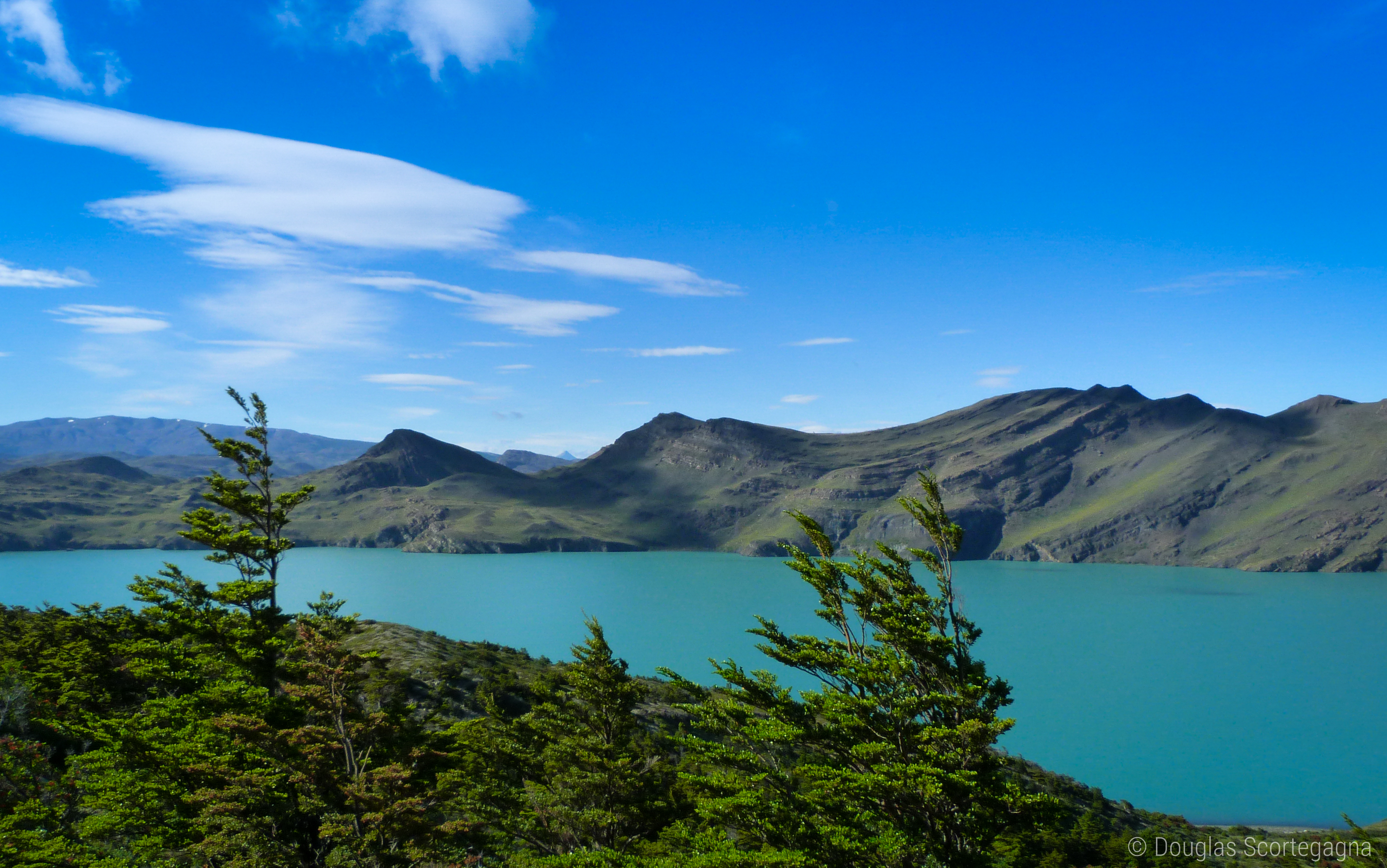
Syncline next to Nordenskjöld Lake in Torres del Paine National Park. The syncline formed during the Andean orogeny.

The early development of the Andean orogeny in southernmost South America affected also the Antarctic Peninsula. In southern Patagonia at the onset of the Andean orogeny in the Jurassic, extensional tectonics created the Rocas Verdes Basin, a back-arc basin whose southeastern extension survives as the Weddell Sea in Antarctica. In the Late Cretaceous the tectonic regime of Rocas Verdes Basin changed leading to its transformation into a compressional foreland basin –the Magallanes Basin– in the Cenozoic. This change was associated with an eastward move of the basin depocenter and the obduction of ophiolites. The closure of Rocas Verdes Basin in the Cretaceous is linked to the high-grade metamorphism of Cordillera Darwin Metamorphic Complex in southern Tierra del Fuego.

As the Andean orogeny went on, South America drifted away from Antarctica during the Cenozoic leading first to the formation of an isthmus and then to the opening of the Drake Passage 45 million years ago. The separation from Antarctica changed the tectonics of the Fuegian Andes into a transpressive regime with transform faults. (Note: Currently these faults have been carved into glacial valleys.)

About 15 million years ago in the Miocene the Chile Ridge began to subduct beneath the southern tip of Patagonia (55° S). The point of subduction, the triple junction has gradually moved to the north and lies at present at 47° S. The subduction of the ridge has created a northward moving "window" or gap in the asthenosphere beneath South America.
