= Guavio Formation =

Geologic formation in Colombia

- Stratigraphic range: Tithonian-Berriasian; ~150–140 Ma
- Type: Geological formation
- Unit of: Cáqueza Group
- Sub-units: Caliza de Las Mercedes Mb. Lutitas de Las Mercedes Mb. Caliza de Malacara Mb. Lutitas de Miralindo Mb. Conglomerado de Miralindo
- Underlies: Macanal Formation
- Overlies: Batá Fm., Girón Fm
- Thickness: up to 1,000 m (3,300 ft)

Lithology
- Primary: Conglomerate
- Other: Limestone, shale

Location
- Coordinates: 4°59′34.1″N 73°28′53.8″W
- Region: Altiplano Cundiboyacense; Eastern Ranges, Andes
- Country: Colombia

Type section
- Named for: Guavio River
- Named by: Rodríguez & Ulloa
- Location: Alto de Miralindo, Guateque
- Year defined: 1976
- Coordinates: 4°59′34.1″N 73°28′53.8″W
- Region: Cundinamarca, Boyacá
- Country: Colombia
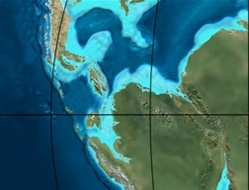
- Paleogeography of Northern South America; 150 Ma, by Ron Blakey

The Guavio Formation (Spanish: Calizas del Guavio, Kicg) is a geological formation of the Altiplano Cundiboyacense, Eastern Ranges of the Colombian Andes. The formation consists of conglomerates, shales and limestones, dates to the Late Jurassic and Early Cretaceous periods; Tithonian to Berriasian epochs and has a maximum thickness of 1,000 metres (3,300 ft).

== Etymology ==
The formation was defined and named in 1976 by Rodríguez and Ulloa after the Guavio River, Cundinamarca.

== Description ==
=== Lithologies ===
The Guavio Formation has a maximum thickness of 1,000 metres (3,300 ft), and is characterised by a sequence of conglomerates, shales and limestones.

=== Stratigraphy and depositional environment ===
The Guavio Formation, the lowermost unit of the Cáqueza Group, overlies the Batá Formation and is overlain by the Macanal Formation. The unit is subdivided into five members, from old to younger; Conglomerado de Miralindo, Lutitas de Miralindo, Caliza de Malacara, Lutitas de Las Mercedes and Caliza de Las Mercedes. The age has been estimated to be Tithonian to Berriasian, spanning the Jurassic-Cretaceous boundary. Stratigraphically, the formation is time equivalent with the Arcabuco Formation. The formation has been deposited in a shallow marine environment in an oxygen-poor basin.

== Outcrops ==
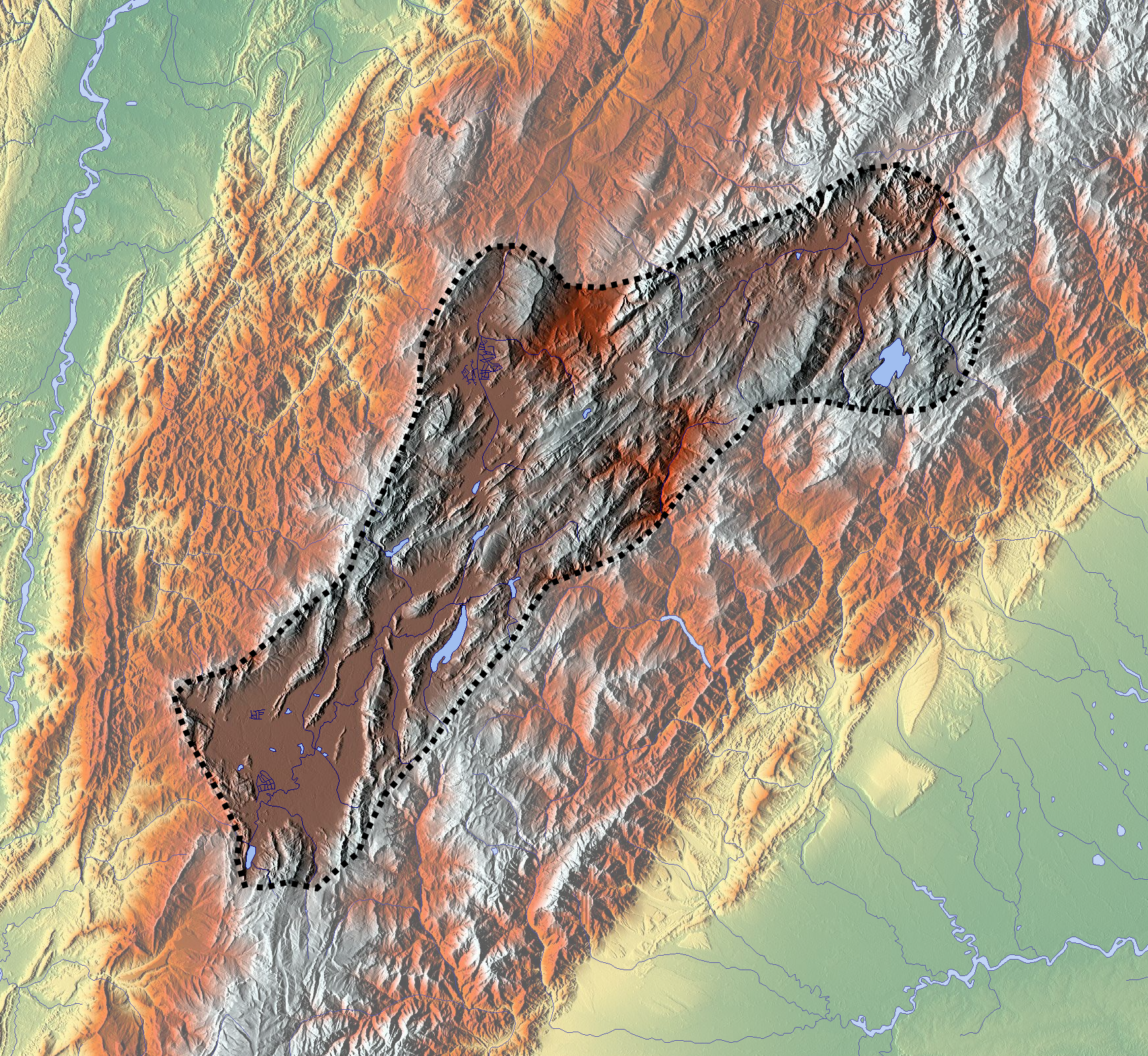
Type locality of the Guavio Formation to the east of the Altiplano Cundiboyacense

The Guavio Formation is apart from its type locality at the Alto de Miralindo and Cuchilla de Manizales, found near Gachalá and Medina.

== See also ==
Geology of the Eastern Hills
Geology of the Ocetá Páramo
Geology of the Altiplano Cundiboyacense
