= Andean foreland basins =

The Andean foreland basins or Sub-Andean basins are a group of foreland basins located in the western half of South America immediately east of the Andes mountains. The Andean foreland basins in the Amazon River's catchment area are known as the Amazonian foreland basins.

In part sediment accumulation, uplift and subsidence of the Andean foreland basins is controlled by transverse zones of "structural accommodation", likely corresponding to ancient continent-wide faults. From the Bolivian Orocline (20° S, also known as Arica Deflection or Arica Elbow) north these zones of accommodation runs with a NEE-SWW orientation and south of the orocline they run with a NW-SE orientation. The Andean foreland basins in Bolivia have largely accumulated continental sediments, most of them of clastic nature.

Beginning in 1920 the Ecuadorian and Peruvian basins were explored for petroleum and in the 1970s their hydrocarbon production increased greatly.

A 2018 synthesis of previous research looked at the sedimentary record of eight foreland basins and 5 hinterland basins to reconstruct a composite model for their development as a single Andean foreland basin system. During the Mesozoic, rapid accumulation of sediment occurred at the onset of back arc extension between 250 and 140 Ma. A dramatic pulse of sediment accumulation occurred during the late Cretaceous linked to the inception of large scale shortening, occurring from 70 to 60 Mya in the northern basins and 100-600 Mya in the southern basins. The Paleogene saw a phase of limited accumulation due to a lull of Andean shortening, 60-20 Mya in the south, 50-30 Mya in the north. From 20 to 30 Ma, rapid accumulation occurred with the highest sedimentation rate recorded in the central Andes, between 3–8 km of sediment was accumulated. Detrital Zircon data aided in identifying sediment source reversals from cratonic sediment sources to magmatic orogenic sources. This inflection occurred in the northern Andes from 70 to 30 Ma, depending on the basin, central Andes around 50 Ma, and in the southern Andes around 100 Ma. Interplay of local climate, uplift histories, shortening and subducting slab geometries influenced the development of individual foreland basins and shaped continent scale drainage patterns, offshore sediment dispersal and ecological development on the South American continent.

Name	Latitude	Country	Details
Cesar-Ranchería Basin	11–8° N	Colombia	Intermontane foreland basin enclosed by the Sierra Nevada de Santa Marta in the northwest, the Oca Fault in the north, the Serranía del Perijá in the east to southeast and the Bucaramanga-Santa Marta Fault in the west.
Eastern Venezuela Basin	10–8° N	Venezuela	The Eastern Venezuela Basin lies between several geological structures. To the south it bounds Guiana Shield, to the north metamorphic rocks of the easternmost Andes, to the west the Espino Graben, to the northeast the Barbados accretionary complex and to the east it bounds to the oceanic crust of the Atlantic Ocean.
Barinas Basin	10–7° N	Venezuela	
Middle Magdalena Valley	8–4° N	Colombia	Intermontane foreland basin enclosed by the Bucaramanga-Santa Marta Fault in the northeast, the Eastern Ranges in the east, the Girardot High in the south and the Central Ranges in the west.
Llanos Basin	7–3° N	Colombia	Most prolific hydrocarbon producing basin of Colombia, enclosed by the Venezuelan border in the north, the Guiana Shield in the east, the Guaviare River in the south and the foothills of the Eastern Ranges in the west.
Upper Magdalena Valley	4–1° N	Colombia	Intermontane foreland basin enclosed by the Girardot High in the north, the Eastern Ranges in the east, and the Central Ranges in the west.
Caguán-Putumayo Basin	3–0° N	Colombia	Enclosed by the Vaupés High in the north, the Peruvian and Ecuadorian borders in the south and the Eastern and Central Ranges in the west.
Oriente Basin	3° N–11° S	Ecuador	The Oriente Basin owes its configuration to the tectonic inversion of rifts of Triassic-Jurassic age due to the tectonic conditions of transpression that have prevailed in the region since the Late Cretaceous.
Marañón Basin	2–6° S	Peru	
Ucayali Basin	6–12° S	Peru	
Madre de Dios Basin	10–13° S	Brazil, Bolivia, Peru	
Beni Plain Basin	13–17° S	Bolivia	
Santa Cruz Basin	17–23° S	Argentina, Bolivia, Brazil, Paraguay	
Northwest Basin	22–32° S	Argentina, Brazil, Paraguay	
Cuyo Basin	27–37° S	Argentina	The Cuyo Basin is an elongated sedimentary basin of NNW-SSE orientation limited to the west by the Sierra Pintada System and to the east by the Pampean pericraton. To the north the basin reaches the area around the city of Mendoza. The basin existed already during the Triassic but its current shape is derivative of the Andean orogeny.
Neuquén Basin	34–40° S	Argentina, Chile	Neuquén Basin is a sedimentary basin that originated in the Jurassic and developed through alternating continental and marine conditions well into the Tertiary. The basin bounds to the west with the Andean Volcanic Belt, to the southeast with the North Patagonian Massif and to the northeast with the Sierra Pintada System.
Magallanes Basin (Austral Basin)	48–54° S	Argentina, Chile	The Magallanes Basin is a foreland basin located in southern Patagonia. The basin covers a surface of about 170.000–200.000 km^{2} and has a NNW-SSE oriented shape. The basin evolved from being an extensional back-arc basin in the Mesozoic to being a compressional foreland basin in the Cenozoic.
