= Dolores-Guayaquil Megashear =

The Dolores-Guayaquil Megashear (Spanish: Megafalla Dolores-Guayaquil) is a first-order shear zone and fault zone in Northern South America. The megashear runs from the Gulf of Guayaquil in southwestern Ecuador, through Colombia, to Dolores in Venezuela.

== See also ==
- Andean Volcanic Belt
