= Nimaima =

- Municipality and town
- Flag Coat of arms

- Location of the municipality and town inside Cundinamarca Department of Colombia

- Location in Colombia
- Coordinates: 5°7′34″N 74°23′9″W
- Country: Colombia
- Department: Cundinamarca

Area
  - Total: 59 km^{2} (23 sq mi)

Population (2015)
  - Total: 6,679
- Time zone: UTC-5 (Colombia Standard Time)

Nimaima (Spanish pronunciation: [niˈnajma]) is a tourist town in Colombia in the Cundinamarca Department.
