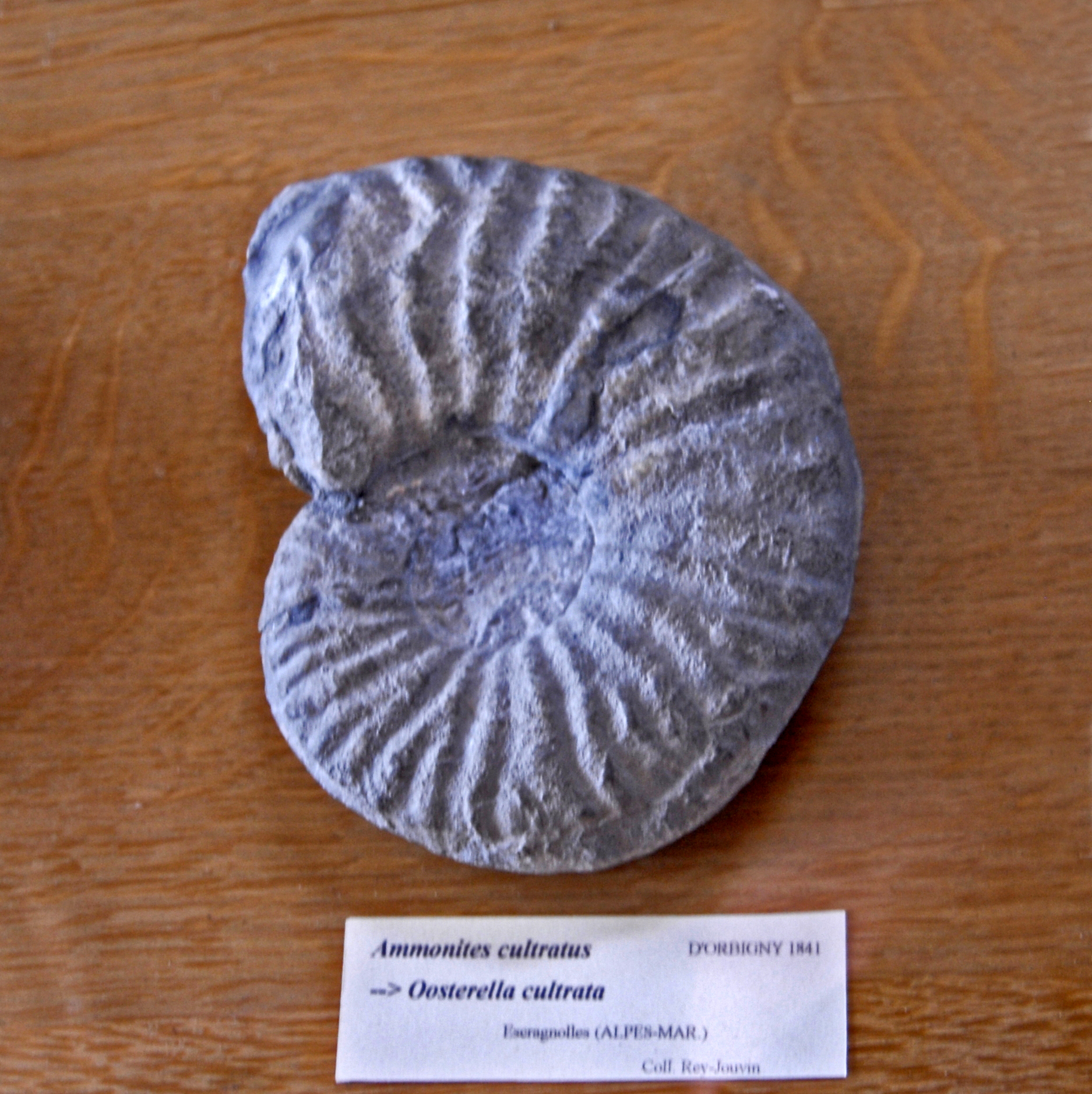
- Fossil of Oosterella cultratus from Maritime Alps, on display at Galerie de paléontologie et d'anatomie comparée in Paris

Scientific classification
- Kingdom: Animalia
- Phylum: Mollusca
- Class: Cephalopoda
- Subclass: †Ammonoidea
- Order: †Ammonitida
- Superfamily: †Perisphinctoidea
- Family: †Oosterellidae; Kilian, 1911

= Oosterellidae =

Oosterellidae Temporal range: Cretaceous, 145.5–130.0 Ma

Extinct family of molluscs

Oosterellidae is an extinct ammonoid cephalopod family belonging to the superfamily Perisphinctoidea. These fast-moving nektonic carnivores lived during the Cretaceous.

== Genera ==
- Oosterella
- Pseudoosterella

== Distribution ==
Fossils of species within this genus have been found in the Cretaceous sediments of Argentina, Austria, Colombia, Czech Republic, France, Hungary, Italy, Mexico, Morocco, Romania and Slovakia.
