= La Naveta Formation =

Geologic formation in Colombia

- Stratigraphic range: Hauterivian-Barremian; ~130–125 Ma
- Type: Geological formation
- Underlies: Trincheras Formation
- Overlies: Útica Formation
- Thickness: unknown

Lithology
- Primary: Siltstone
- Other: Shale

Location
- Coordinates: 5°15′13″N 74°20′28″W
- Region: Altiplano Cundiboyacense; Eastern Ranges, Andes
- Country: Colombia

Type section
- Named by: Hubach
- Location: Bogotá River
- Year defined: 1931
- Coordinates: 5°15′13″N 74°20′28″W
- Region: Cundinamarca
- Country: Colombia

The La Naveta Formation (Spanish: Formación La Naveta, Kiln) is a geological formation of the Altiplano Cundiboyacense, Eastern Ranges of the Colombian Andes. The formation consists of a lower part of coraline limestones and an upper sequence of quartzitic sandstones with intercalated black shales and dates to the Early Cretaceous period; Hauterivian to Barremian epochs.

== Etymology ==
The formation was first defined as Horizonte de La Naveta by Hubach in 1931 and in 1969 by Cáceres and Etayo elevated to formation.

== Description ==
=== Lithologies ===
The La Naveta Formation is characterised by a lower part of coraline limestone and an upper sequence of quartzitic sandstones with black shales intercalated.

=== Stratigraphy and depositional environment ===
The La Naveta Formation overlies the Útica Formation and is overlain by the Trincheras Formation. The age has been estimated to be Hauterivian to Barremian. Stratigraphically, the formation is time equivalent with the Las Juntas, Ritoque and Paja Formations.

== Outcrops ==
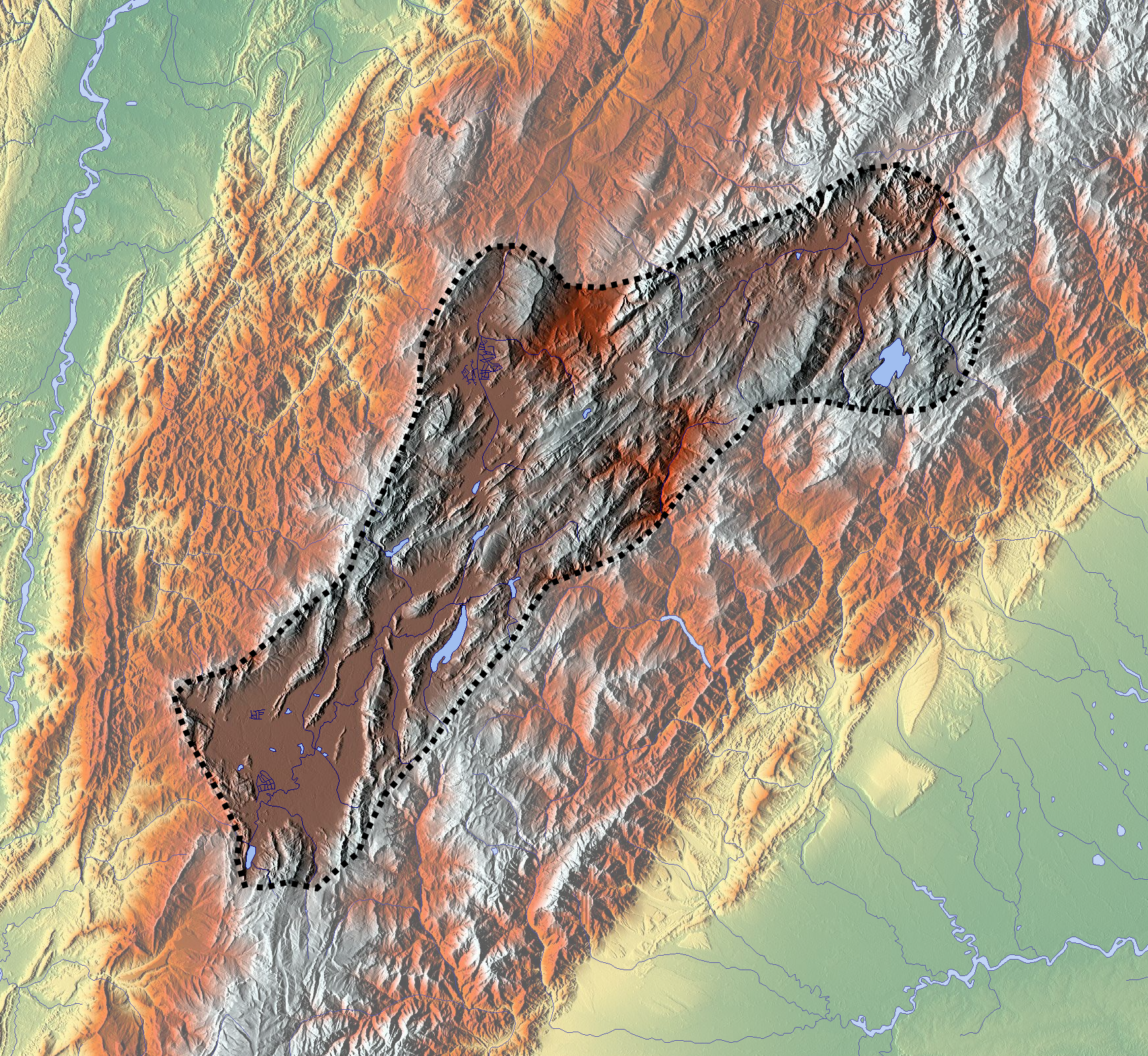
Type locality of the La Naveta Formation to the northwest of the Bogotá savanna

The La Naveta Formation has its type locality to the north of the Bogotá River.

== See also ==
Geology of the Eastern Hills
Geology of the Ocetá Páramo
Geology of the Altiplano Cundiboyacense
