= Forebulge =

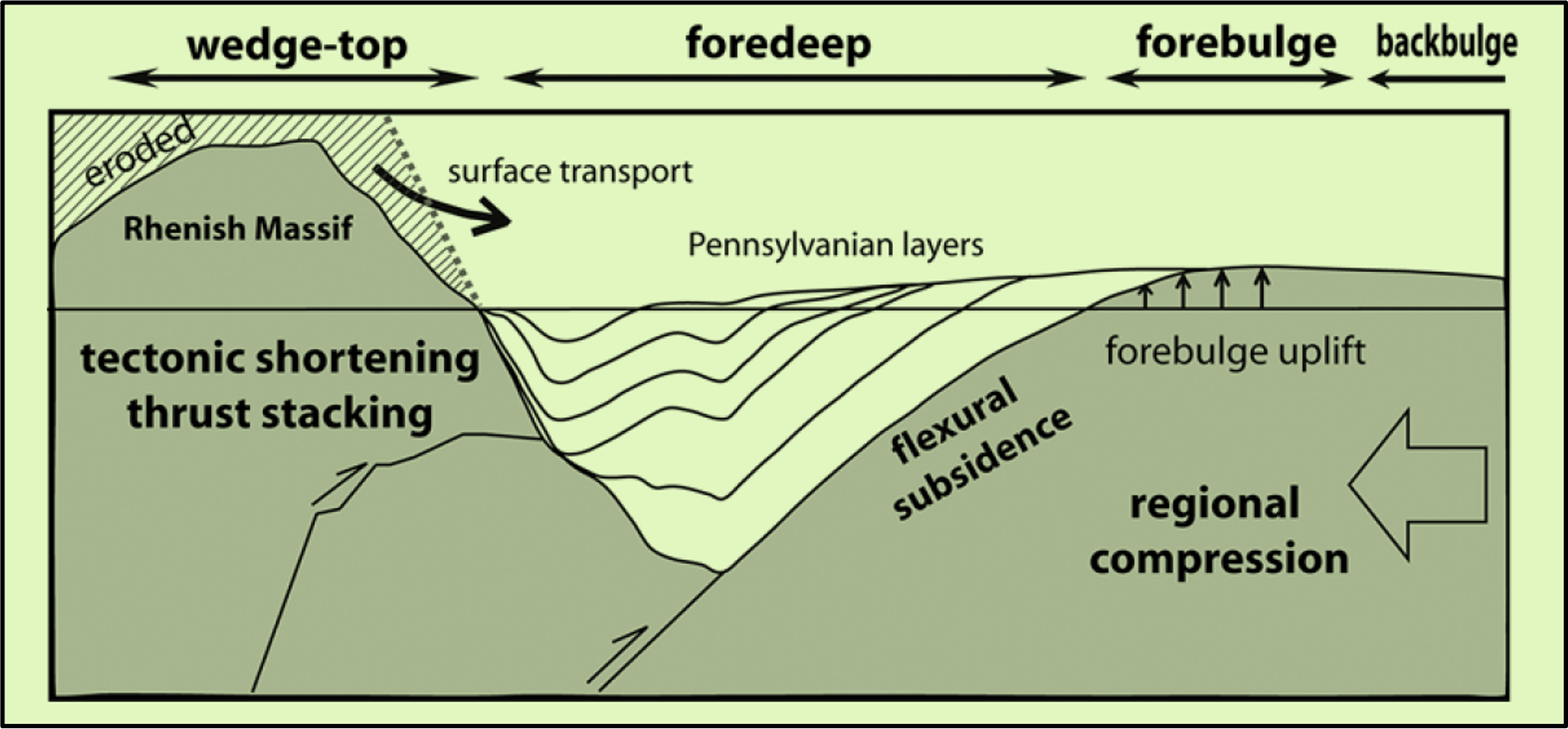
Example of forebulge via lithospheric flexure in the formation of a Foreland basin.

In geology, a forebulge is a flexural bulge in front as a result of a load on the lithosphere, often caused by tectonic interactions and glaciations. An example of forebulge can be seen in the Himalayan foreland basin, a result of the Indian-Eurasian (continent-continent) plate collision, in which the Indian plate subducted and the Eurasian plate created a large load on the lithosphere, leading to the Himalayas and the Ganges foreland basin.

== Background ==
Forebulge is most commonly found with continent-continent convergent collisions, in which the formation of mountain ranges as the plates collide places a large load on the lithosphere below. The lithosphere flexes in response to the load on the mantle, causing depression and subsidence (foredeep) followed by the forebulging in the front. The forebulge area is lifted by a height that is 4% of the depression height caused by the load. It takes roughly 10,000 to 20,000 years for forebulge to fully develop when the mantle flexure reaches isostatic equilibrium, a process that is controlled by mantle viscosity.

== Tectonic ==
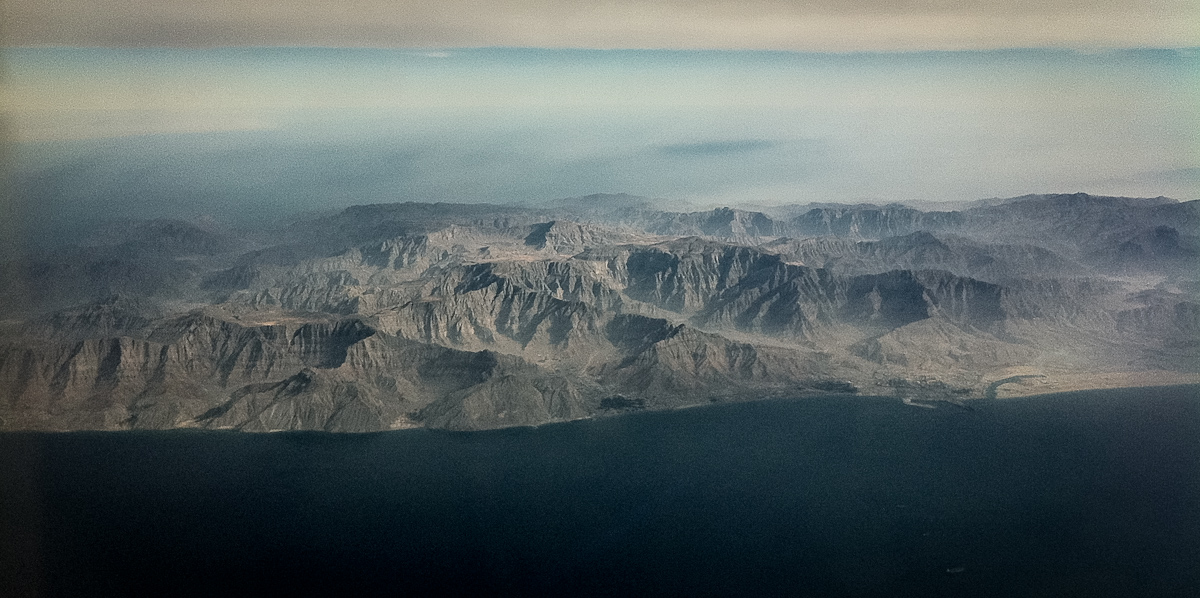
View of the Persian Gulf with the Zagros Mountains whose load on the lithosphere helped to form the Gulf.

Forebulge can be seen during the formation of a mountain range, which creates a large load and crustal thickening that leads to lithospheric flexure. Part of the land sinks under the load (Foredeep) while part of the outer land forebulges, leading to the creation of these foreland basins. Forebulge associated with the formation of these basins is most commonly a result of convergent collision. Foreland basins can occur in convergent subduction, but this is rare. These basins are linked to fold-thrust belts, which are divided into three main types: collisional (peripheral), retroarc, and retreating collisional subduction. Collisional and retroarc thrust belts form in collision convergent plates whereas retreating collisional forms when the subduction rate exceeds the convergence rate of the collision.

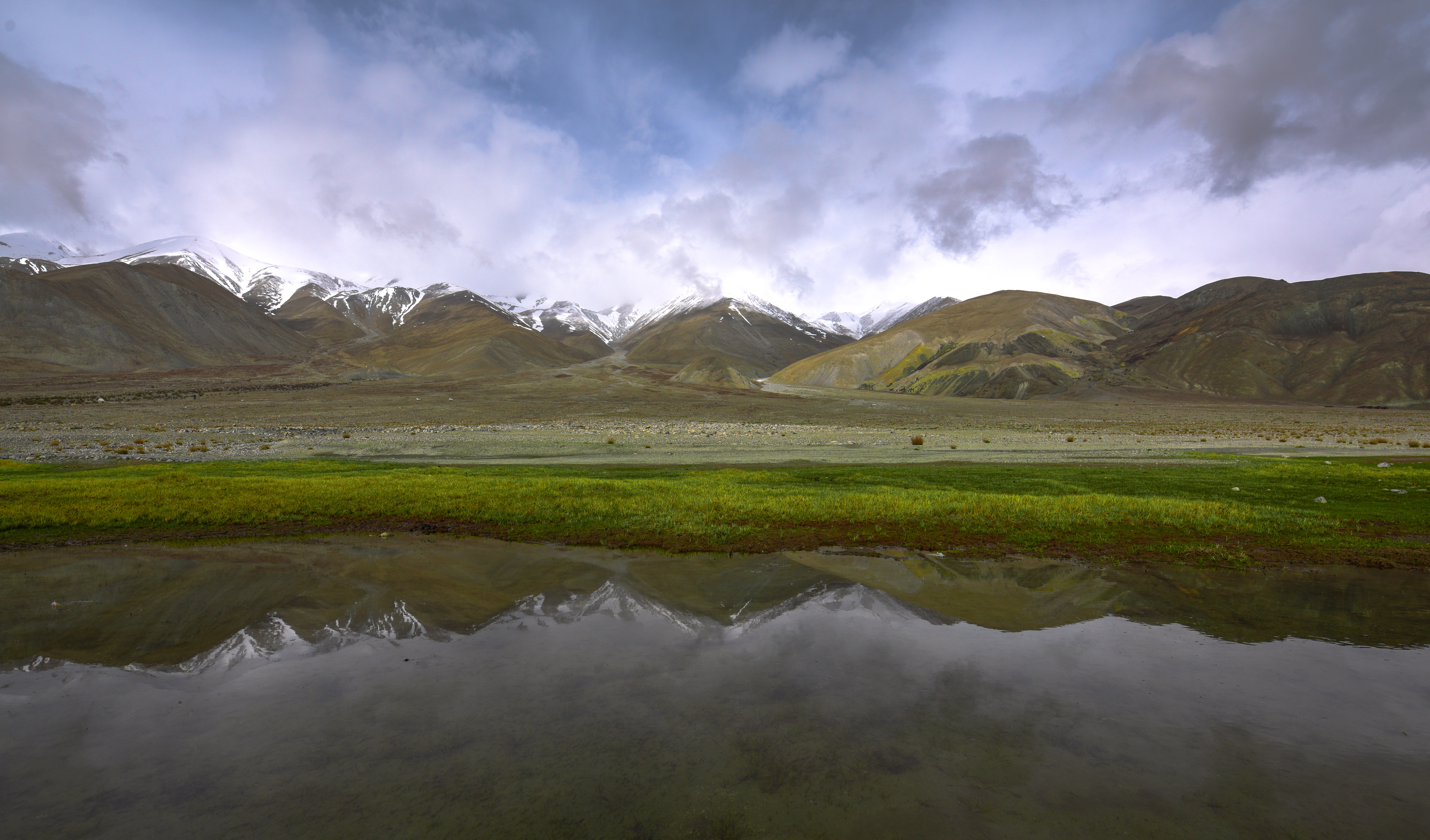
The Ganges Basin seen next to the Himalayas whose load on the lithosphere helped to create the basin.

The Persian Gulf foreland basin and forebulge was created as a result of the collision of the Arabian and Eurasian plates around 13 million years ago. The Zagros mountains that formed, as a result, created a load on the lithosphere that led to the creation of the modern-day Persian Gulf.

Collisions between tectonic plates and island arcs lead to loading and flexure of the lithosphere. The flexure produces a significant forebulge, which divides a forearc basin and a back arc basin.

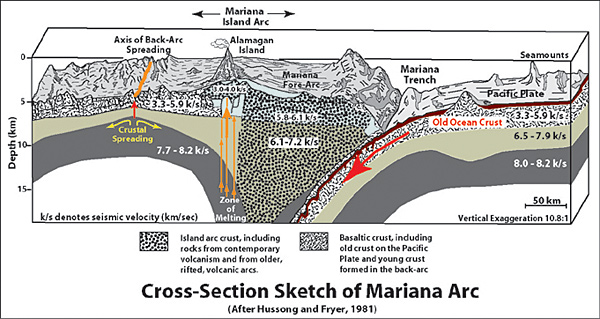
Forebulge can be seen here in the Mariana Trench where the Pacific plate is subducted.

The Ganges basin and Himalayan Basin roughly 50 to 70 million years ago as a result of the load of the Himalayan mountains after the collision of the Eurasian and Indian plates.

The Andean foreland basins were created as a result of the lithospheric flexure due to the load of the Andean mountain (fold-thrust belt) and resulting foredeep, forebulge, and backbulge.

Forebulge can also be observed in the flexural plate of the Mariana arc, which was formed when the Pacific plate subducted under the Philippine plate.

== Glacial ==
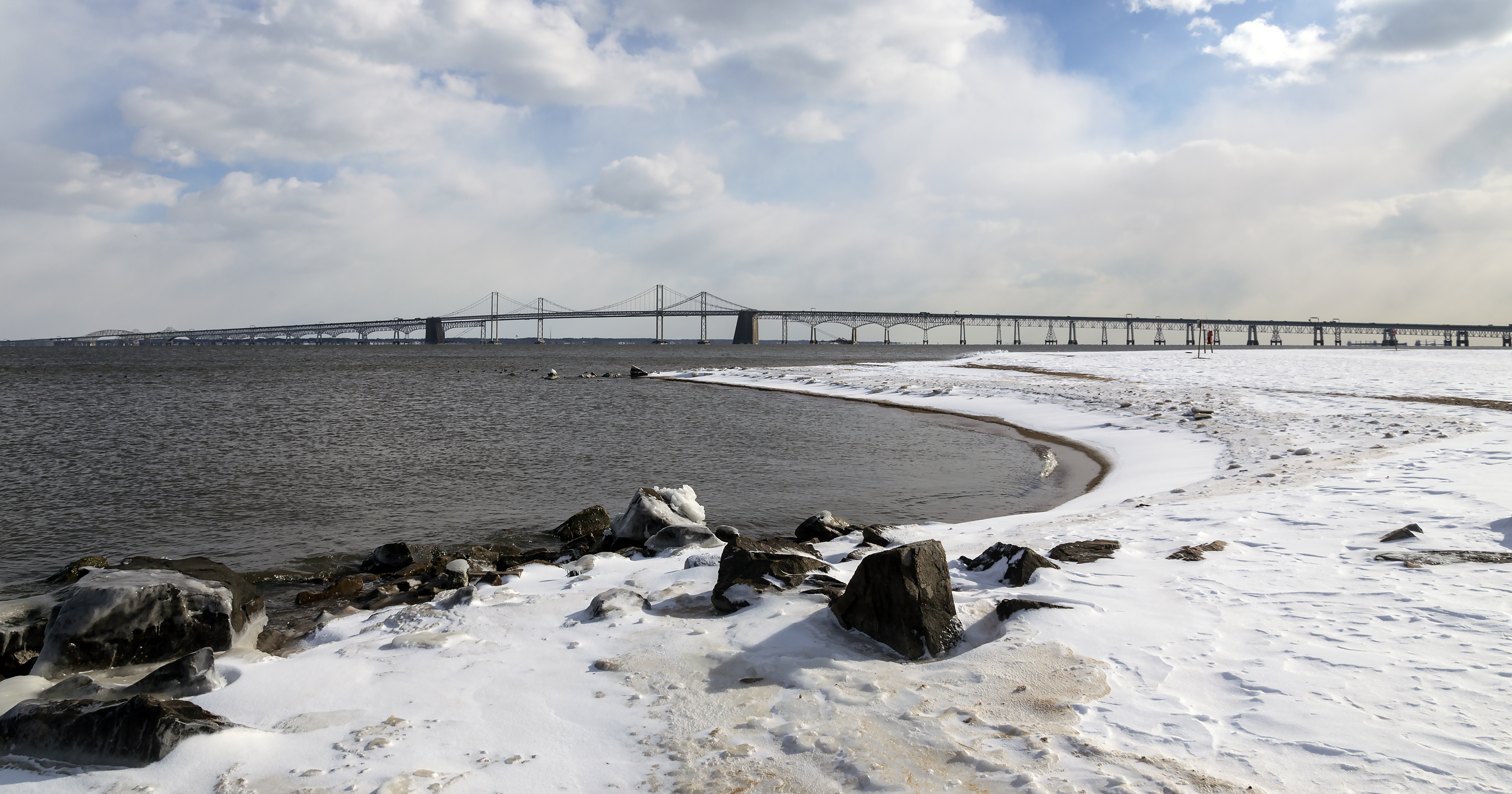
Chesapeake Bay is one area currently experiencing a rise in sea level due to post-glacial rebound.

One cause for forebulge formation is the loading of the continental lithosphere by ice sheets during continental glaciations. Due to recession of the ice sheets, the formerly-glaciated areas are currently rising in a phenomenon known as post-glacial rebound. Forebulge collapse due to post-glacial rebound is greatest along the east coast of the United States, which lay just under the North American ice sheet. As a result of forebulge collapse due to post-glacial rebound, most of the coast of the Eastern US has slowly been sinking; it is estimated that the area around the Chesapeake Bay will sink a foot (0.305 m) over the next hundred years. Due to the coupling of the mantle with the plates, data from post-glacial rebound are used as a direct probe of the viscosity of the upper mantle. As an ice sheet collapses, the land that was previously depressed rises in isostatic recovery followed by subsidence of forebulge, causing sea levels to rise. Forebulge collapse is also the reason why the Netherlands and parts of southern England are still slowly sinking. One estimate is that the center of the North Sea rose by about 170 m (558 ft) during the Ice Age because of forebulging.
