= List of municipalities in Boyacá =

Flag of Boyacá

This is a list of municipalities in the Boyacá Department in Colombia.

1. Almeida
2. Aquitania
3. Arcabuco
4. Belén
5. Berbeo
6. Betéitiva
7. Boavita
8. Boyacá
9. Briceño
10. Buenavista
11. Busbanzá
12. Caldas
13. Campohermoso
14. Cerinza
15. Chinavita
16. Chiquinquirá
17. Chíquiza
18. Chiscas
19. Chita
20. Chitaraque
21. Chivatá
22. Chivor
23. Ciénaga
24. Coper
25. Corrales
26. Covarachía
27. Cubará
28. Cucaita
29. Cuítiva
30. Cómbita
31. Duitama
32. El Cocuy
33. El Espino
34. Firavitoba
35. Floresta
36. Gachantivá
37. Garagoa
38. Guacamayas
39. Guateque
40. Guayatá
41. Gámeza
42. Güicán
43. Iza
44. Jenesano
45. Jericó
46. La Capilla
47. La Uvita
48. La Victoria
49. Labranzagrande
50. Macanal
51. Maripí
52. Miraflores
53. Mongua
54. Monguí
55. Moniquirá
56. Motavita
57. Muzo
58. Nobsa
59. Nuevo Colón
60. Oicatá
61. Otanche
62. Pachavita
63. Paipa
64. Pajarito
65. Panqueba
66. Pauna
67. Paya
68. Paz de Río
69. Pesca
70. Pisba
71. Puerto Boyacá
72. Páez
73. Quipama
74. Ramiriquí
75. Rondón
76. Ráquira
77. Saboyá
78. Samacá
79. San Eduardo
80. San José de Pare
81. San Luis de Gaceno
82. San Mateo
83. San Miguel de Sema
84. San Pablo de Borbur
85. Santa María
86. Santa Rosa de Viterbo
87. Santa Sofía
88. Santana
89. Sativanorte
90. Sativasur
91. Siachoque
92. Soatá
93. Socha
94. Socotá
95. Sogamoso
96. Somondoco
97. Sora
98. Soracá
99. Sotaquirá
100. Susacón
101. Sutamarchán
102. Sutatenza
103. Sáchica
104. Tasco
105. Tenza
106. Tibaná
107. Tibasosa
108. Tinjacá
109. Tipacoque
110. Toca
111. Togüí, Boyacá
112. Tota
113. Tunja
114. Tununguá
115. Turmequé
116. Tuta
117. Tutasá
118. Tópaga
119. Ventaquemada
120. Villa de Leyva
121. Viracachá
122. Zetaquirá
123. Úmbita
