= Furatena Airport =

- IATA: none; ICAO: SKFR

Summary
- Airport type: Public
- Serves: Quípama, Colombia
- Location: Boyacá
- Elevation AMSL: 3,850 ft / 1,173 m
- Coordinates: 5°31′17″N 74°10′55″W

Map
- Location of the airport in Colombia

Runways
Direction	Length		Surface
Direction	m	ft	Surface
16/34	870	2,854	Gravel
- GCM Google Maps OurAirports

Furatena Airport (ICAO: SKFR) is an airport serving the emerald region of the western emerald belt and town of Quípama in the Boyacá Department of Colombia. The airport is four nautical miles west of Muzo Airport.

The town and airport are on the side of a steep mountain slope, 2,200 feet (670 m) above the Quebrada Sonadora in the Eastern Ranges of the Colombian Andes. The runway sits on a narrow shelf next to the town, with dropoffs on both ends and the west side. Mountainous terrain exists in all quadrants.

== Etymology ==
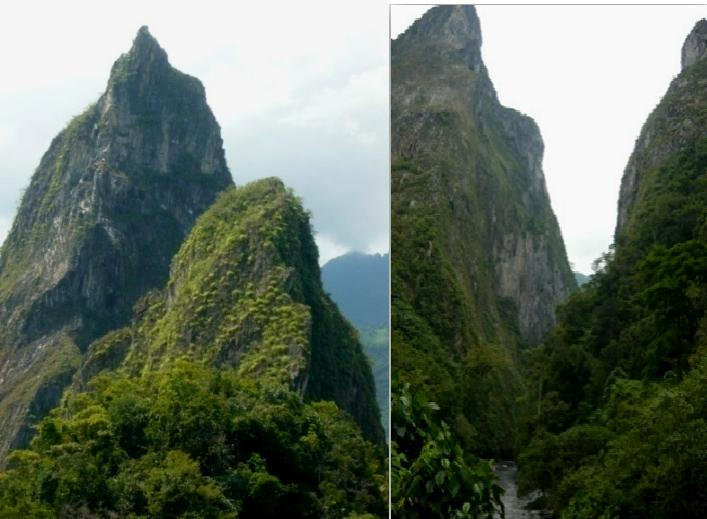
The sacred mountain peaks Fura and Tena

The airport is named after Furatena, a cacica of the Muzo and the double mountain peak close to the airport, Fura and Tena. The mountains, separated by the Minero River and located in the San Pablo de Borbur and Pauna respectively, were considered sacred by the Muzo. According to the Muzo legends, the tears of Fura turned into emeralds and butterflies. The Muisca performed secret pilgrimages to Fura and Tena, avoiding the Muzo warriors to discover them. In his work Compendio historial de la conquista del Nuevo Reino de Granada, Lucas Fernández de Piedrahita tells about the existence of a cacica named Furatena. Furatena was the owner of the finest emeralds of the Muzo territories and in the early years of the Spanish conquest, zipa Sagipa wanted to see Furatena.

== See also ==
- Transport in Colombia
- List of airports in Colombia
