= Western Boyacá Province =

Western Boyacá Province Provincia de Boyacá Occidente
- Province
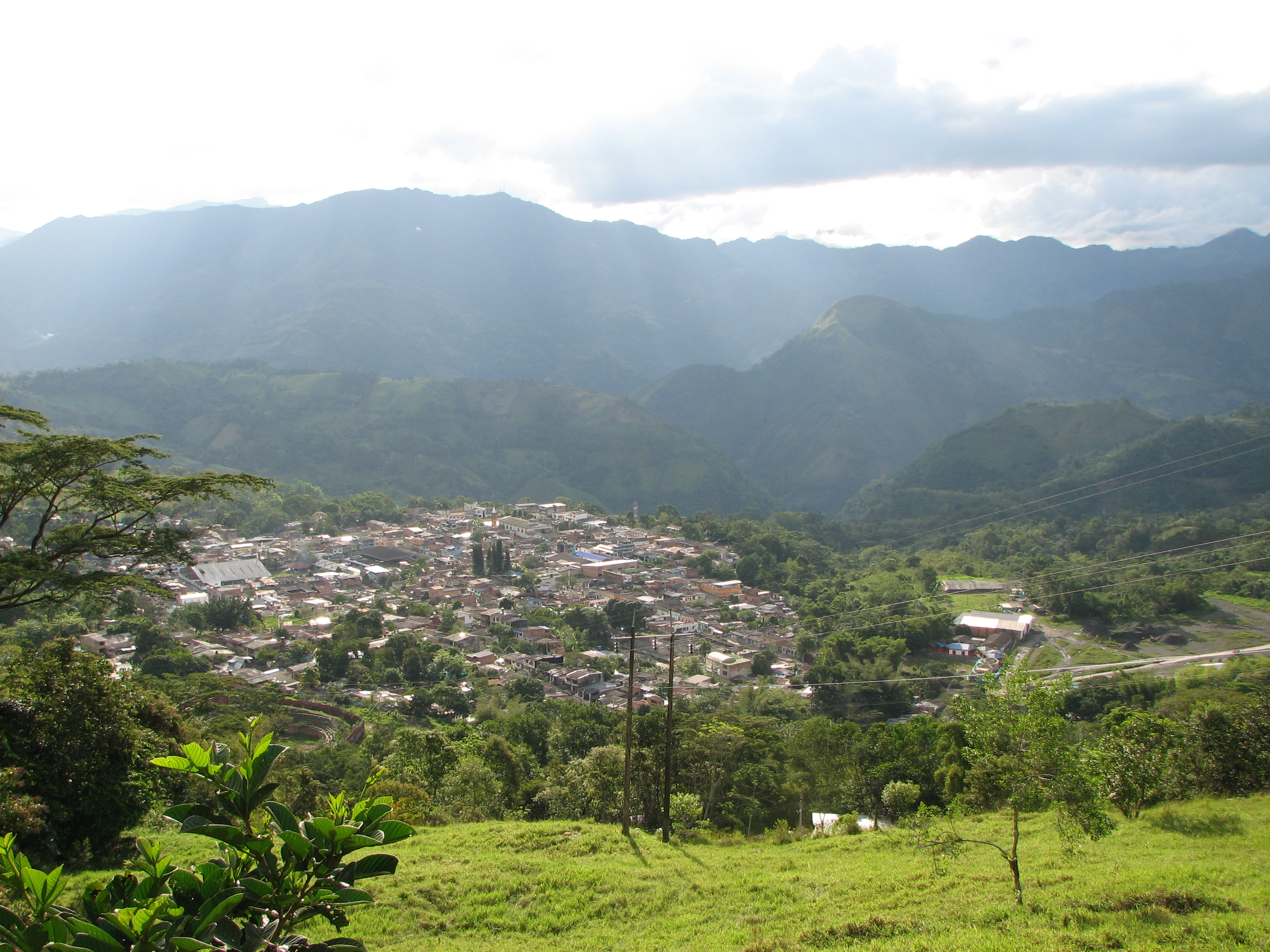
- View of Muzo

- Location of Western Boyacá Province in Colombia
- Coordinates: 5°05′00″N 73°22′00″W
- Country: Colombia
- Department: Boyacá
- Capital: Chiquinquirá
- Municipalities: 15

Area
  - Total: 4,427 km^{2} (1,709 sq mi)
- Time zone: UTC−5 (COT)
- Indigenous groups: Muzo; Muisca

The Western Boyacá Province is a province of the Colombian Department of Boyacá. The province is formed by 15 municipalities. The province hosts the western belt of the rich emerald deposits of Boyacá.

== Municipalities ==
Briceño • Buenavista • Caldas • Chiquinquirá • Coper • La Victoria • Maripí • Muzo • Otanche • Pauna • Quipama • Saboyá • San Miguel de Sema • San Pablo de Borbur • Tununguá
