= Tununguá =

Coordinates: 5°44′N 73°56′W

- Municipality and town
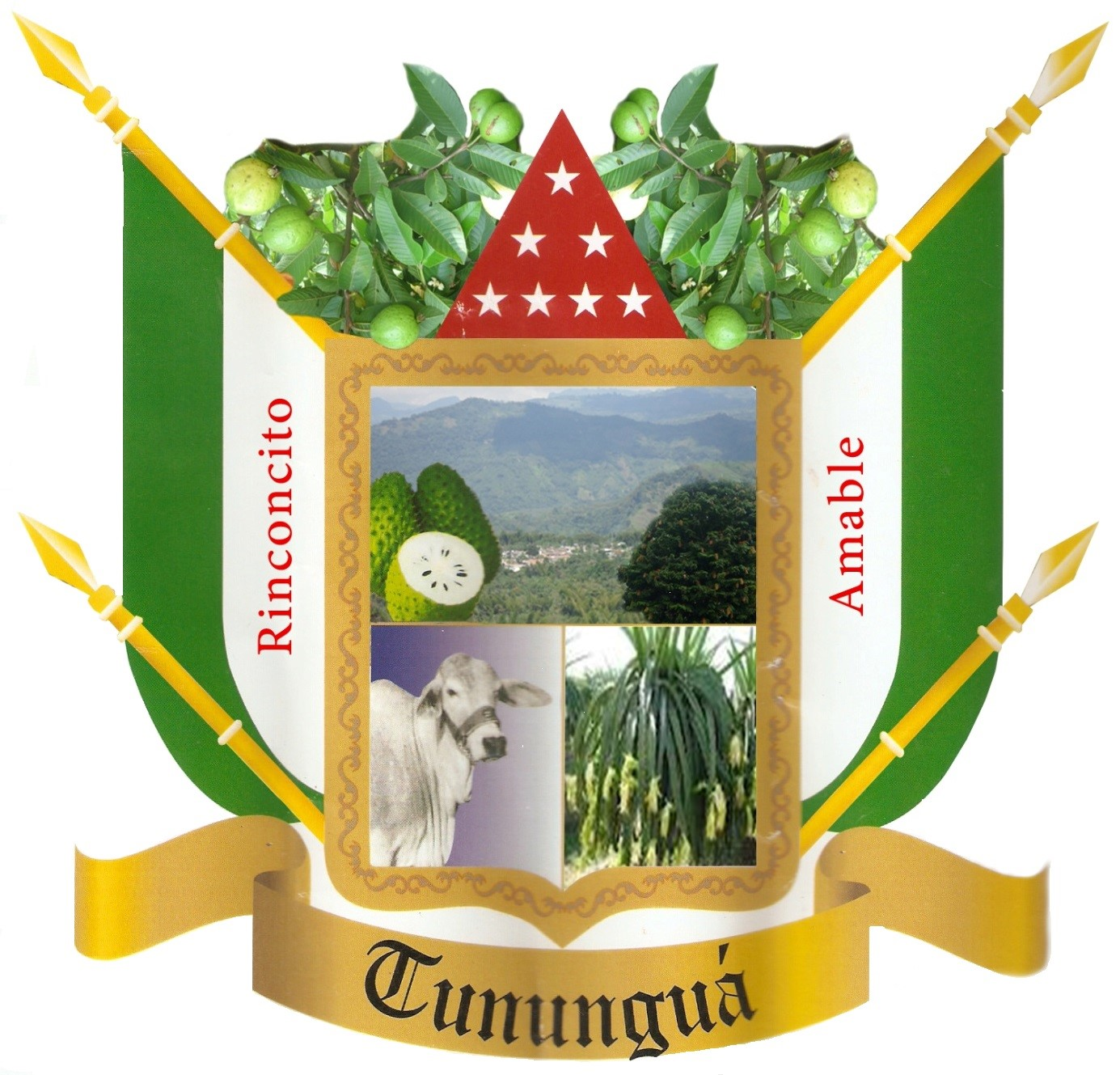
- Flag Coat of arms

- Location of the municipality and town of Tununguá in the Boyacá Department of Colombia
- Country: Colombia
- Department: Boyacá Department
- Province: Western Boyacá Province
- Founded: 30 November 1962

Government
  - Mayor: Ermes Uriel Cómbita Santana (2020-2023)

Area
  - Municipality and town: 77 km^{2} (30 sq mi)
- Elevation: 1,246 m (4,088 ft)

Population (2015)
  - Municipality and town: 1,840
  - Density: 24/km^{2} (62/sq mi)
  - Urban: 379
- Time zone: UTC-5 (Colombia Standard Time)
- Website: Official website

Tununguá is a town and municipality in Boyacá Department, Colombia, part of the subregion of the Western Boyacá Province. Tununguá is situated in the Eastern Ranges of the Colombian Andes at a relatively low altitude of 1,246 metres (4,088 ft). The municipality borders the department of Santander in the north and east and the Boyacá municipalities Pauna (south and west) and Briceño (south).

== History ==
Tununguá is located in the valley of Chiquinquirá, a town 53 kilometres (33 mi) to the east and the area was inhabited before the Spanish conquest by the Muisca (east) and Muzo.

Tununguá is named after cacique Tununguá, who was said to be a descendant of the children of Fura and Tena, from the Muzo myth Furatena.

Tununguá formed a larger municipality with neighbouring Briceño and was properly founded on November 30, 1962.

== Economy ==
Around 85% of the economy of Tununguá comes from agriculture; main products coffee, guayaba, bananas, yuca, oranges, mandarines, lemon and others at smaller scale such as guanábana, peanuts and cacao. The remaining 15% comes from livestock farming.
