= San Miguel de Sema =

Coordinates: 5.55°N 73.75°W

- Municipality and town
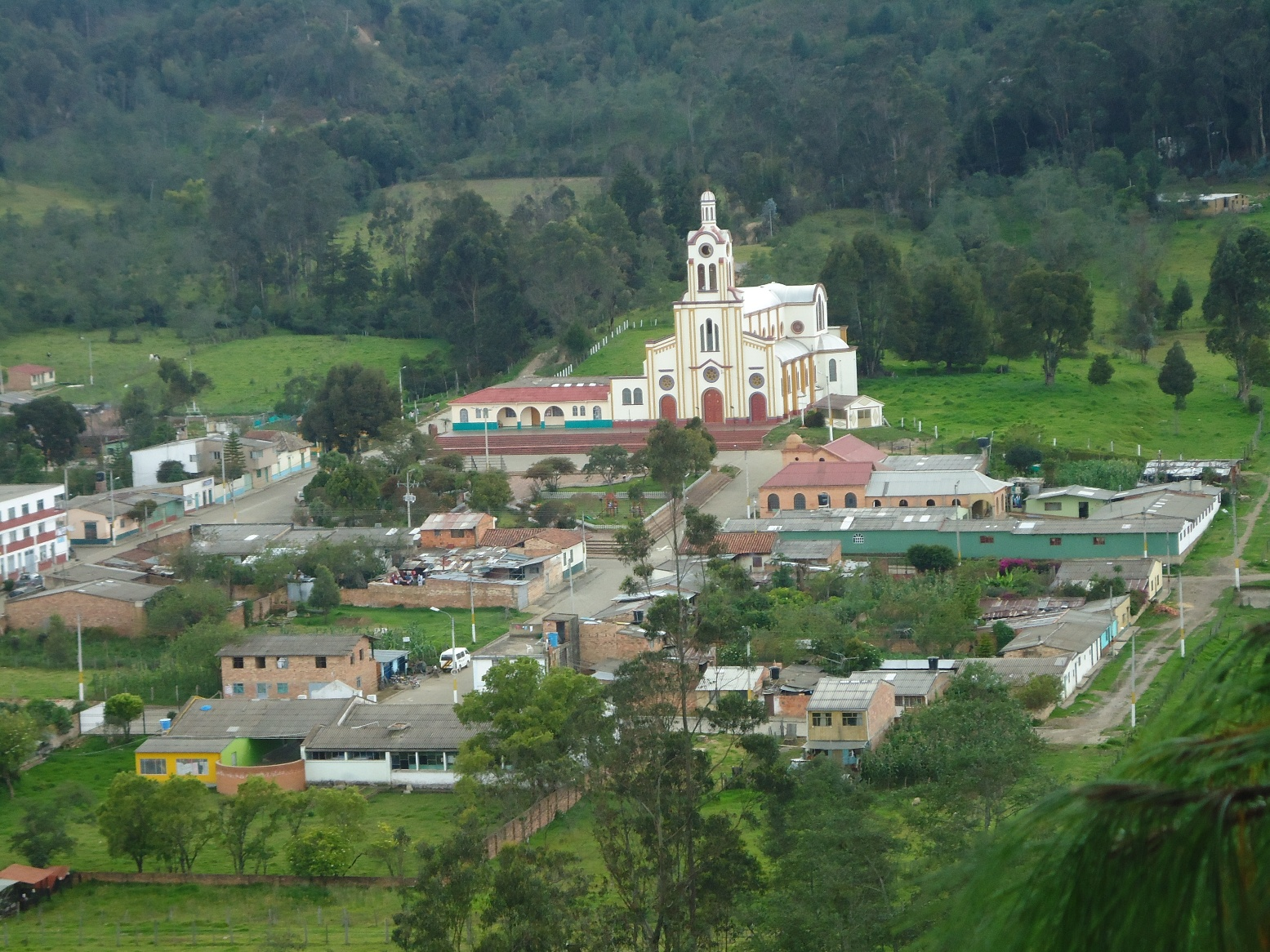
- View of San Miguel de Sema

- Flag

- Location of the municipality and town of San Miguel de Sema in the Boyacá Department of Colombia
- Country: Colombia
- Department: Boyacá Department
- Province: Western Boyacá Province
- Founded: 8 November 1915

Government
  - Mayor: Oscar Triviño Gil (2020-2023)

Area
  - Municipality and town: 90 km^{2} (35 sq mi)
  - Urban: 0.21 km^{2} (0.081 sq mi)
- Elevation: 2,615 m (8,579 ft)

Population (2015)
  - Municipality and town: 4,556
  - Density: 51/km^{2} (130/sq mi)
  - Urban: 488
- Time zone: UTC-5 (Colombia Standard Time)
- Website: Official website

San Miguel de Sema is a town and municipality in Boyacá Department, Colombia, part of the subregion of the Western Boyacá Province. It is one of the 123 municipalities of the department of Boyacá, Colombia, located to the west of the department with the urban centre at an altitude of 2,615 metres (8,579 ft). It is bordered by the municipalities Chiquinquirá, Simijaca, Fúquene (Cundinamarca), and the Boyacá municipalities Ráquira and Tinjacá.

== Etymology ==
The name San Miguel de Sema is a combination of the Spanish name for the archangel Saint Michael and the name of a tribe who lived in the area before the Spanish conquest; Sema or Semita.

== History ==
The area of San Miguel de Sema, located in the valley of Chiquinquirá-Ubaté, was inhabited by the Muisca, organised in a loose confederation. The rule over San Miguel de Sema was by a cacique of Chiquinquirá, loyal to the zaque, based in Hunza.

The town was founded on November 8, 1915 and recognized as a municipality on the year of 1960. In 1925 was group of judges conformed by the paths old cattle ranch, Sirigay, Quintone and Peñablanca. Luis Alberto Ospina was the leader who managed the creation from the Municipality to his death his children continued the foundation process that occurred in 1960.

== Economy ==
The main source of income of the municipality is the milk cattle ranch, especially Holstein cattle. Its production is so important that nowadays some of the producing companies of milk derivatives have installed storing centers. Zones of the municipality still exist where the main line continues to be agriculture, primarily of potatoes and corn.

== Tourism ==
The church is tributed to Saint Michael the Archangel (San Miguel Arcángel) is only one of the most beautiful in the department. San Miguel de Sema gives access to Lake Fúquene.

== Celebrations ==
Fairs and celebrations made in the second week of November, 10, 11 and 12, summon to the inhabitants and neighbors of the region by means of run of bulls and horse and bovine shows. The patronal saint of the village is San Miguel Arcángel.

== Gallery ==
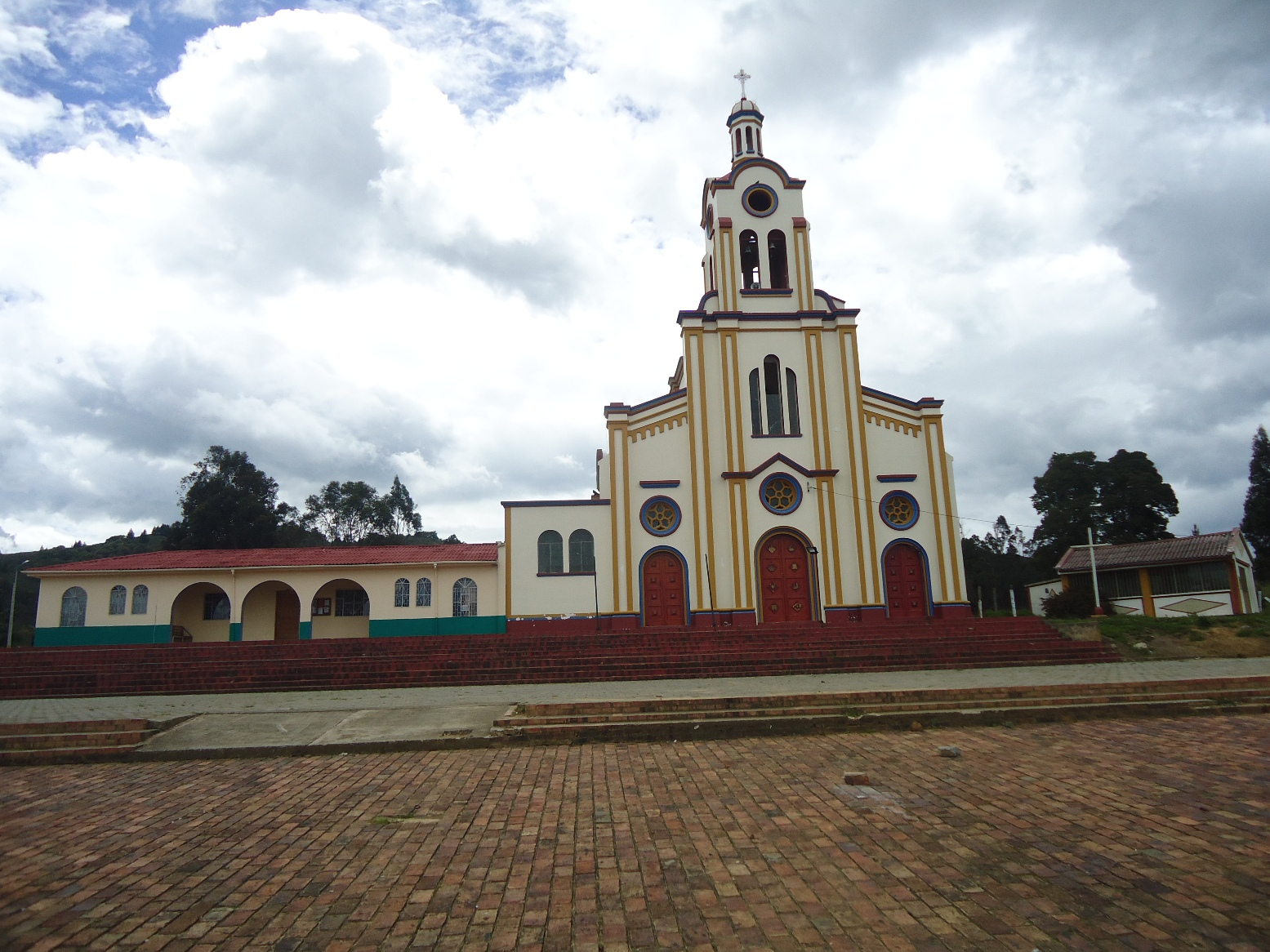
Central square and church

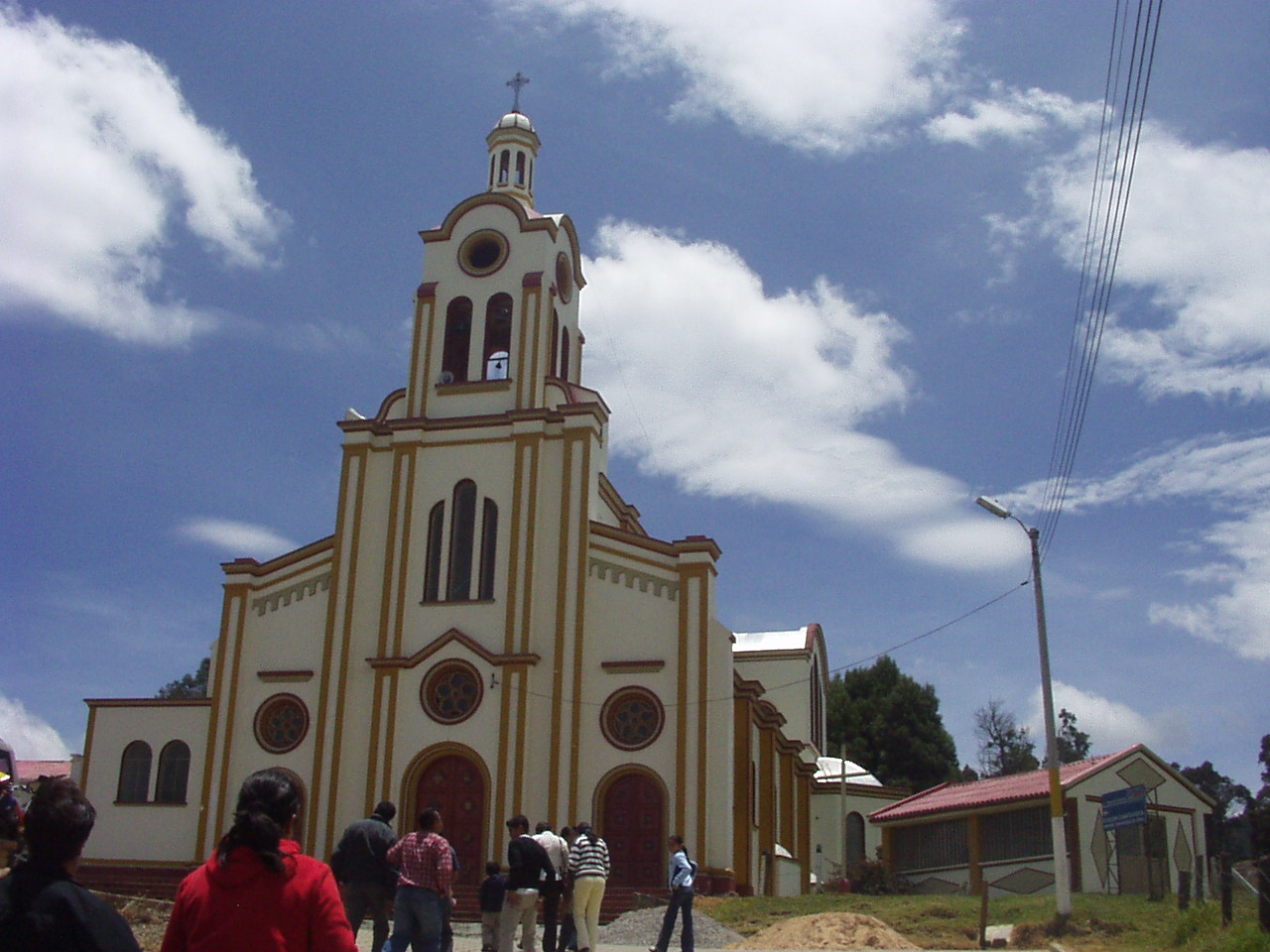
Church

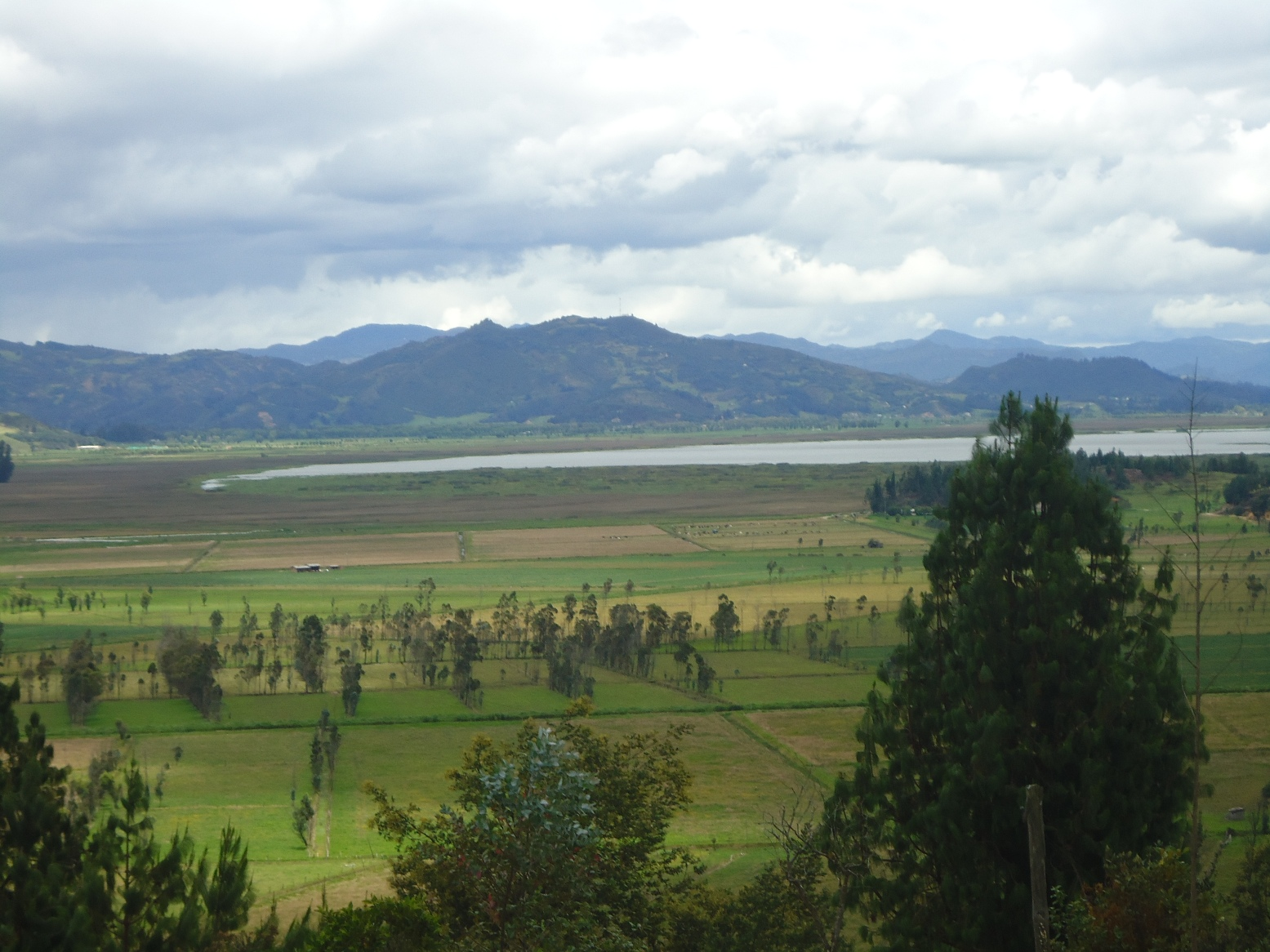
Cattle farming in rural San Miguel de Sema
Lake Fúquene in the background

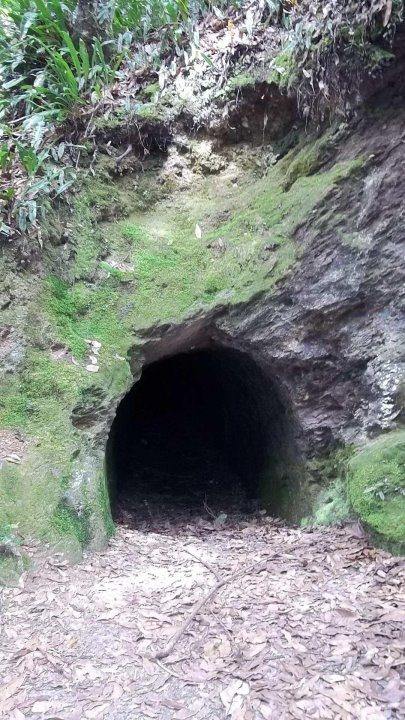
Tunnel in San Miguel de Sema
