= Ráquira =

Coordinates: 5°32′N 73°38′W

- Municipality and town
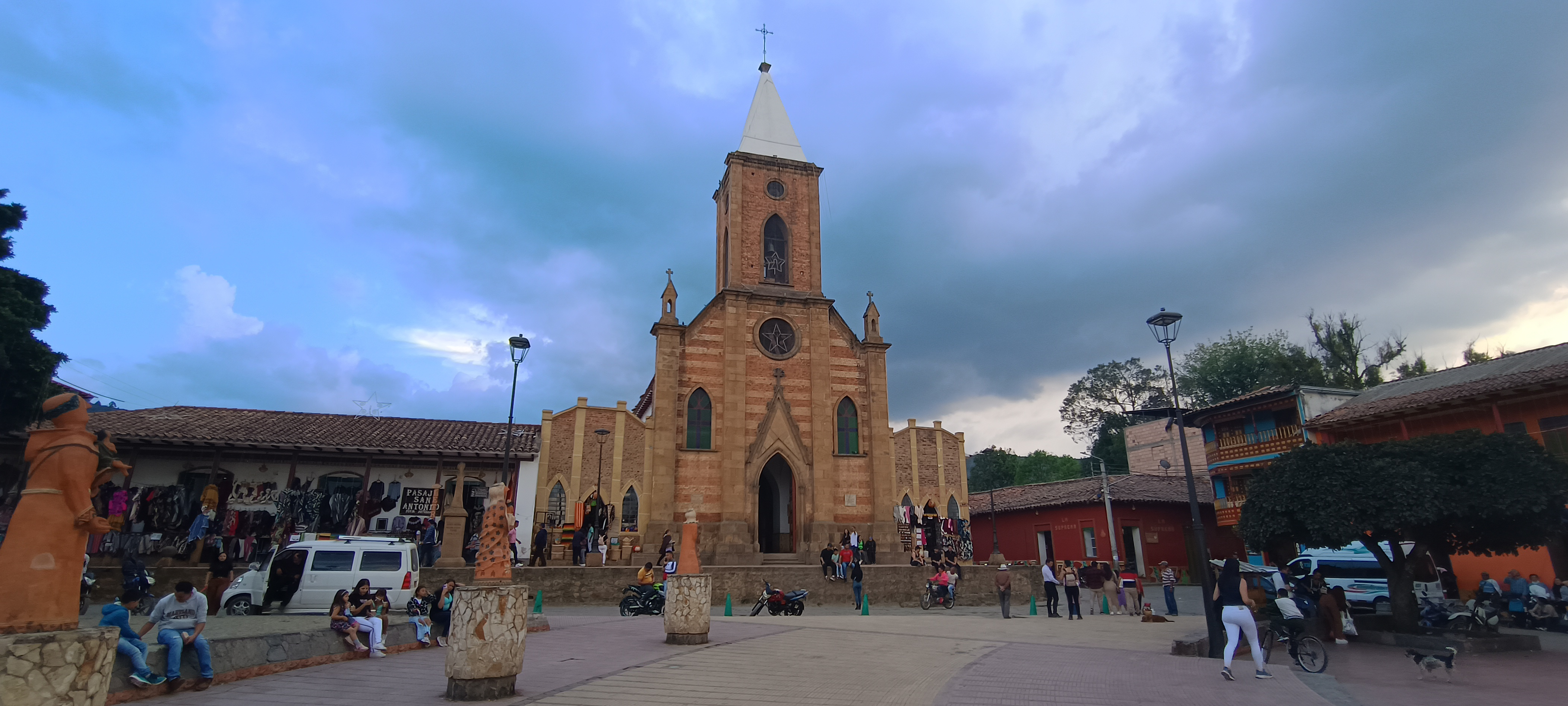
- Church of Ráquira

- Flag

- Location of the municipality and town of Ráquira in the Boyacá Department of Colombia
- Country: Colombia
- Department: Boyacá Department
- Province: Ricaurte Province
- Founded: 18 October 1580
- Founder: Francisco de Orejuela

Government
  - Mayor: José Hernán Sierra Buitrago (2020-2023)

Area
  - Municipality and town: 233 km^{2} (90 sq mi)
- Elevation: 2,150 m (7,050 ft)

Population (2015)
  - Municipality and town: 13,588
  - Density: 58.3/km^{2} (151/sq mi)
  - Urban: 3,425
- Time zone: UTC-5 (Colombia Standard Time)
- Website: Official website

Ráquira, is a municipality and town in Boyacá Department, Colombia, part of the subregion of the Ricaurte Province. Ráquira is situated on the Altiplano Cundiboyacense and the urban center at an altitude of 2,150 metres (7,050 ft). It borders Tinjacá and Sutamarchán in the north, Guachetá, Cundinamarca in the south, in the east Sáchica and Samacá and in the west San Miguel de Sema and Lake Fúquene.

== Etymology ==
In Chibcha, Ráquira means "Village of the pans".

== History ==
The area of Ráquira was inhabited by the Muisca in the centuries before the Spanish conquest of the central highlands of the Colombian Andes. Already in those times Ráquira was famous for its ceramics due to the clay of the area.

In March 1537 conquistador Gonzalo Jiménez de Quesada crossed the valley around Ráquira. Modern Ráquira was founded on October 18, 1580 by friar Francisco de Orejuela.

== Economy ==
About three quarters of the economy of Ráquira is centered on the handcrafts. Other economical activities are agriculture, livestock farming and mining.

== Tourism ==
Ráquira is famous in Colombia for its colony of artisans, who produce traditional northern Andean pottery & hand-woven goods. The Sunday market is especially a popular time to visit. Ráquira is also known for its colorful houses that contrast with the famous nearby town of Villa de Leyva.

== Gallery ==
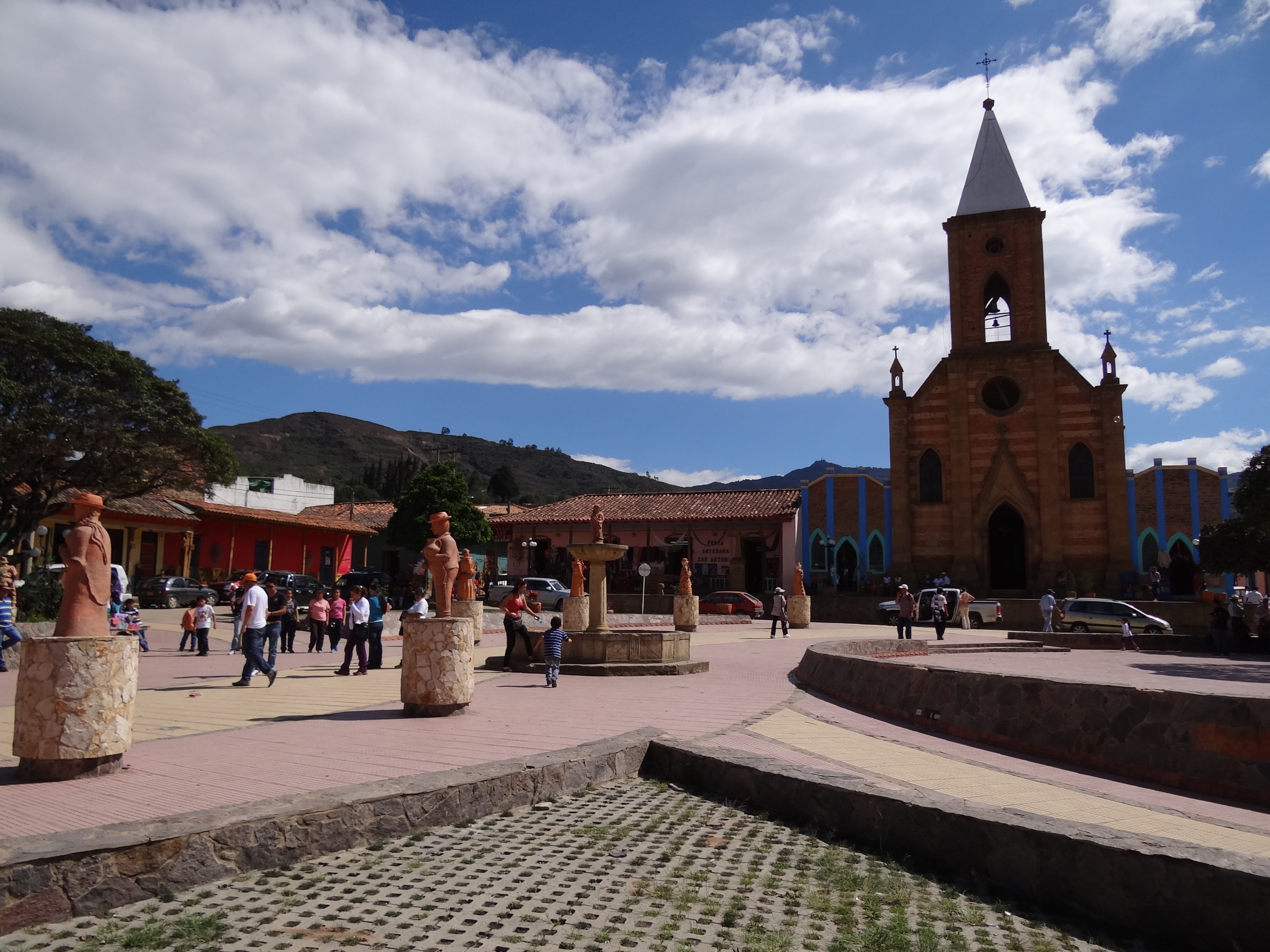
Central square and church Ráquira

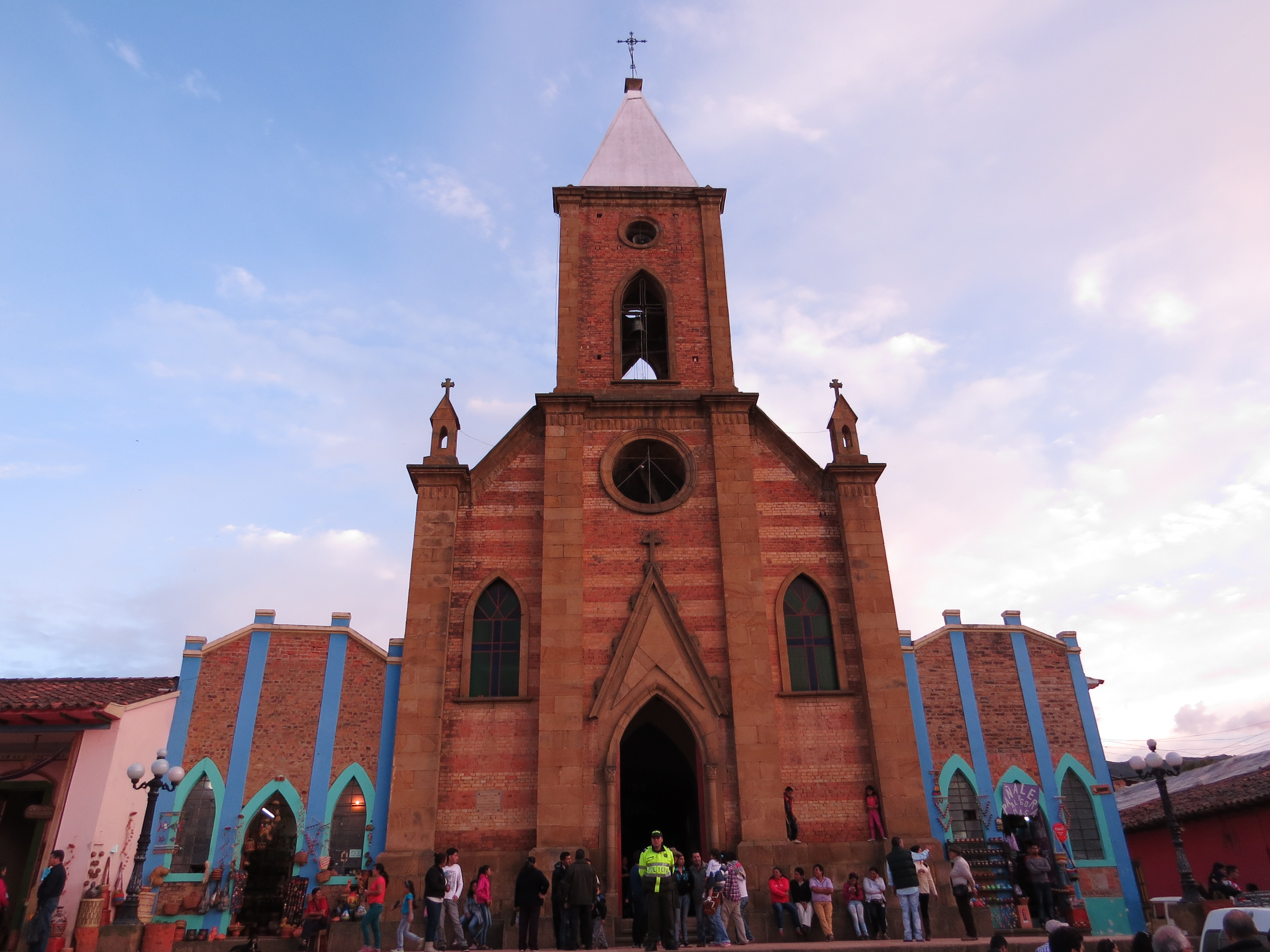
Church

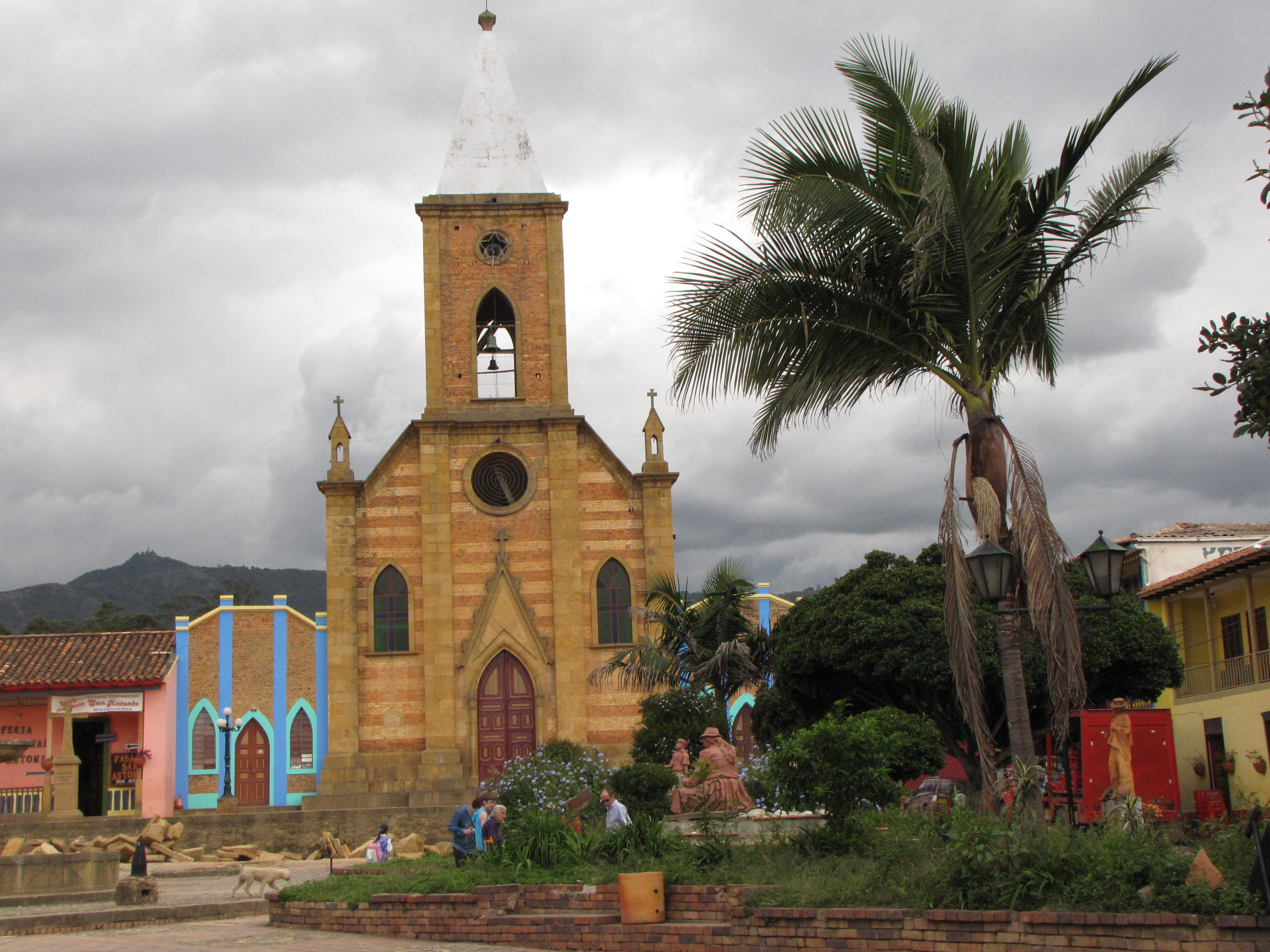
Church

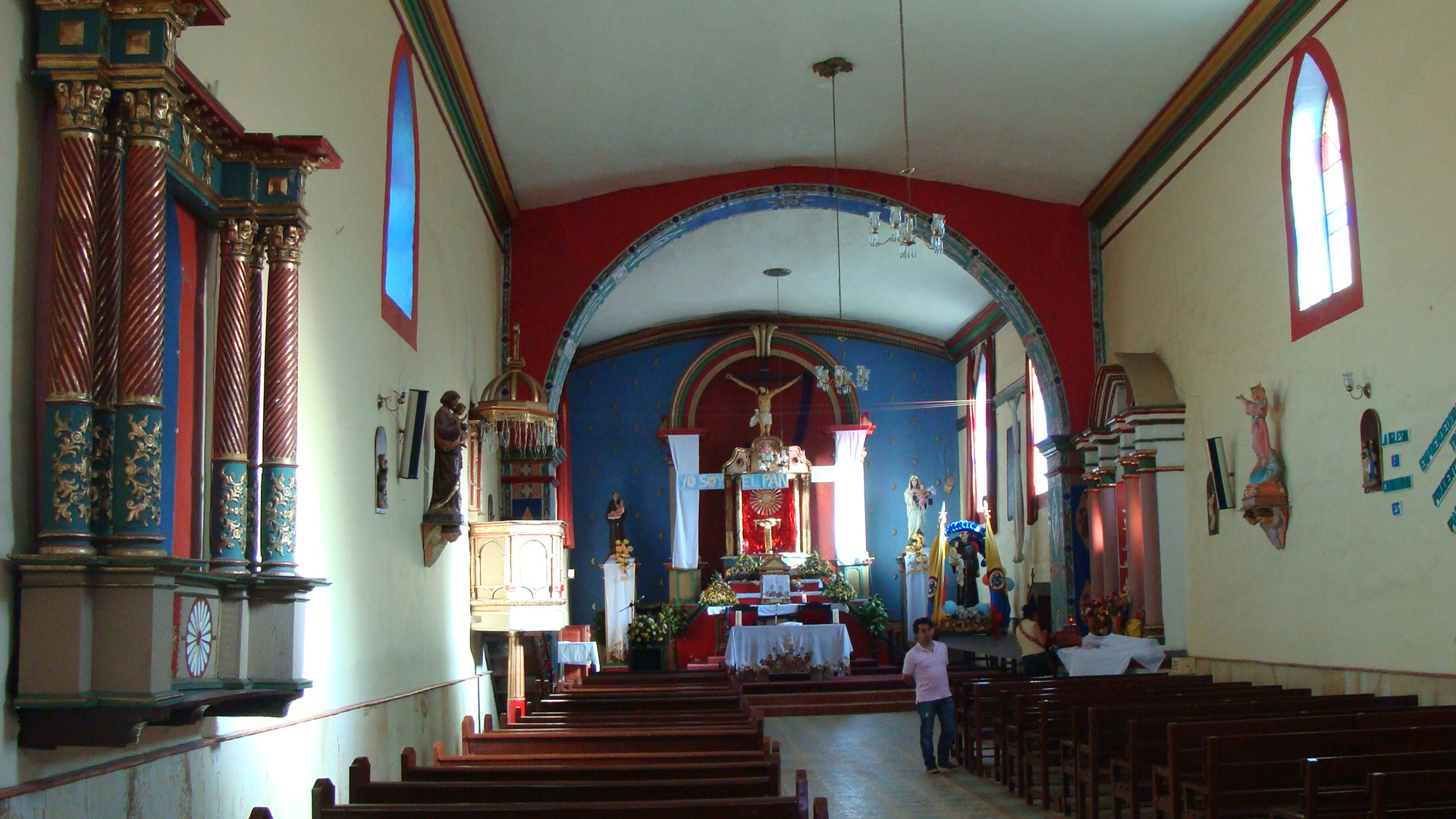
Church interior
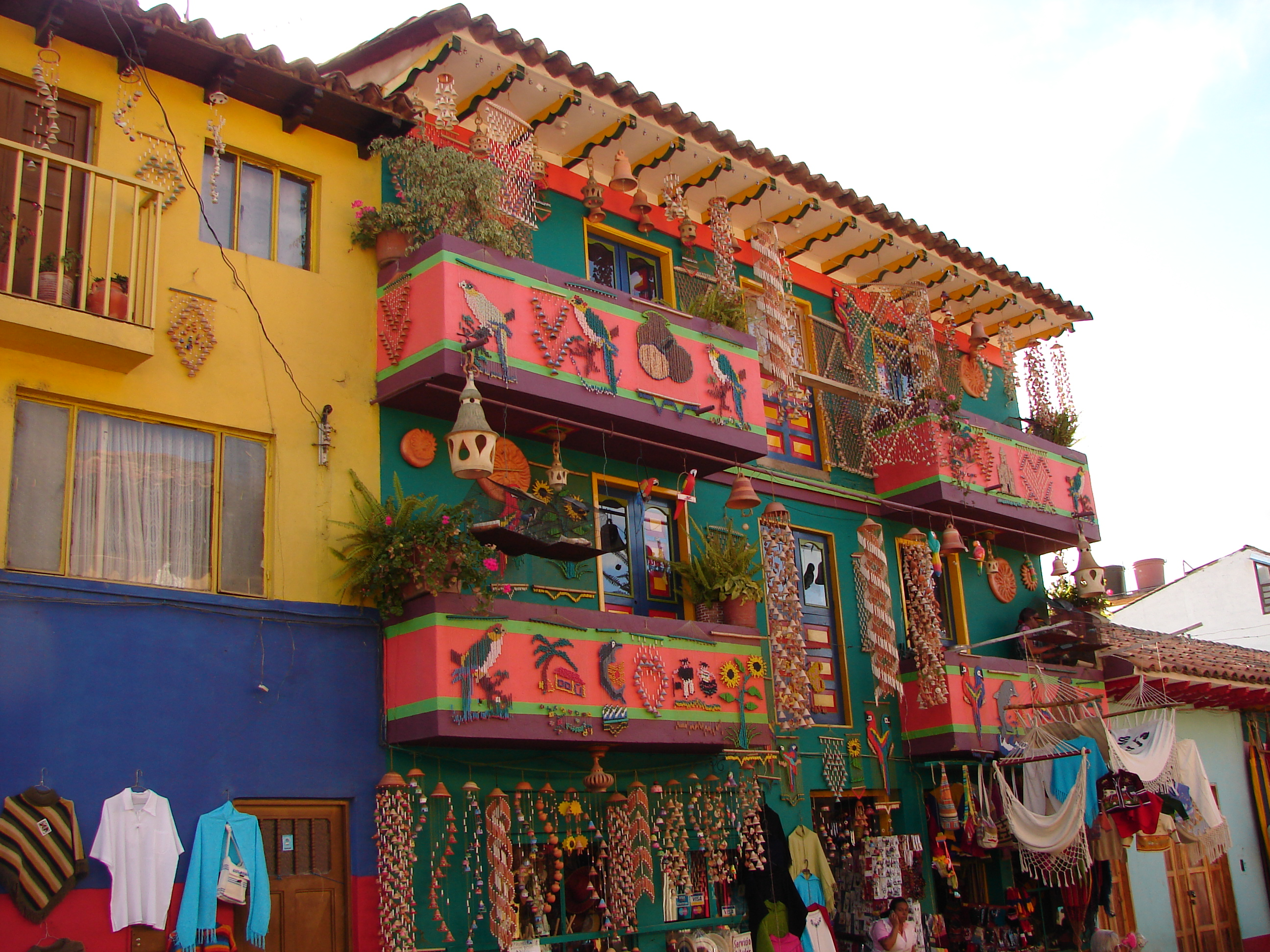
Arts and crafts in Ráquira

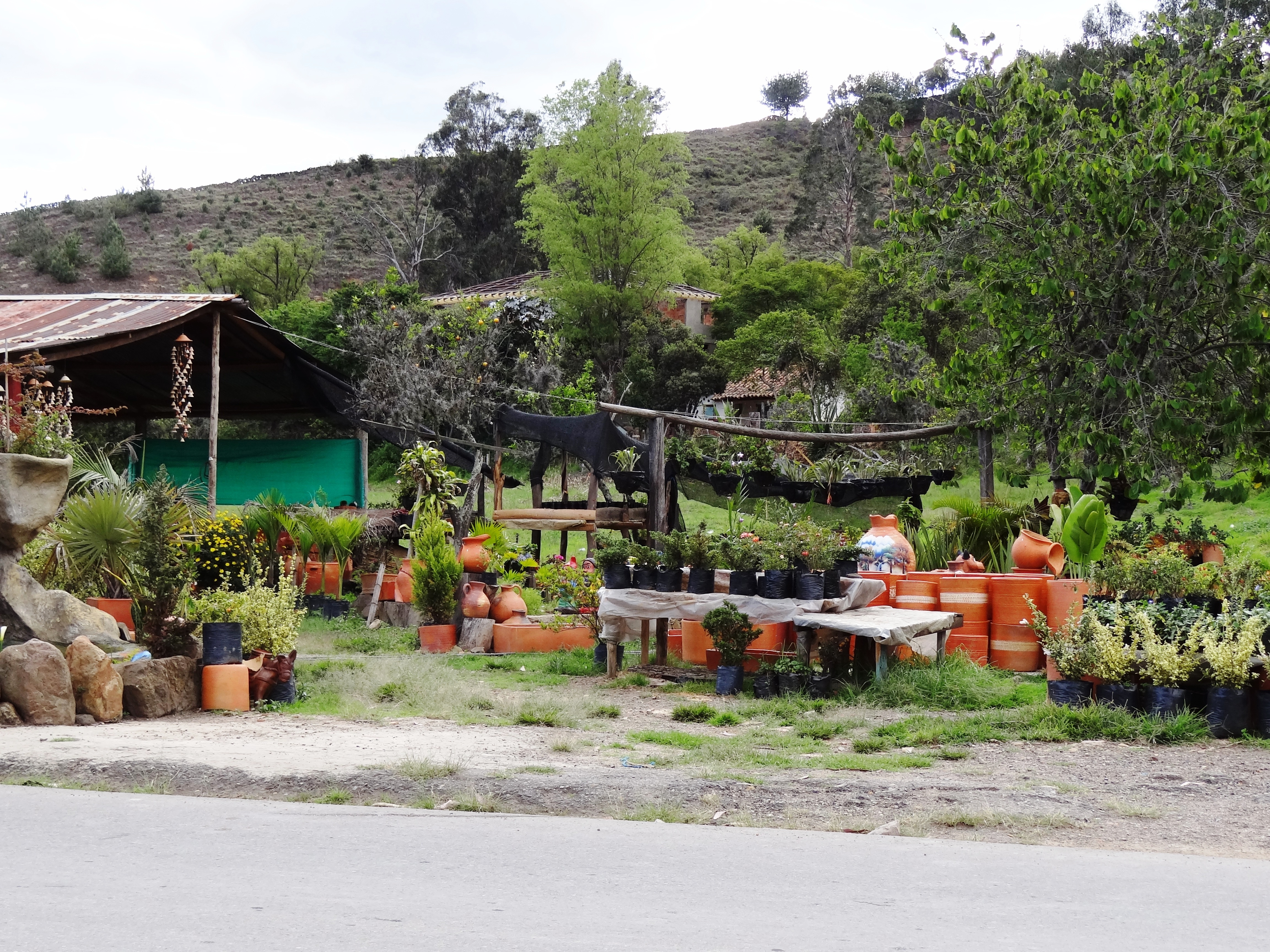
Crafts

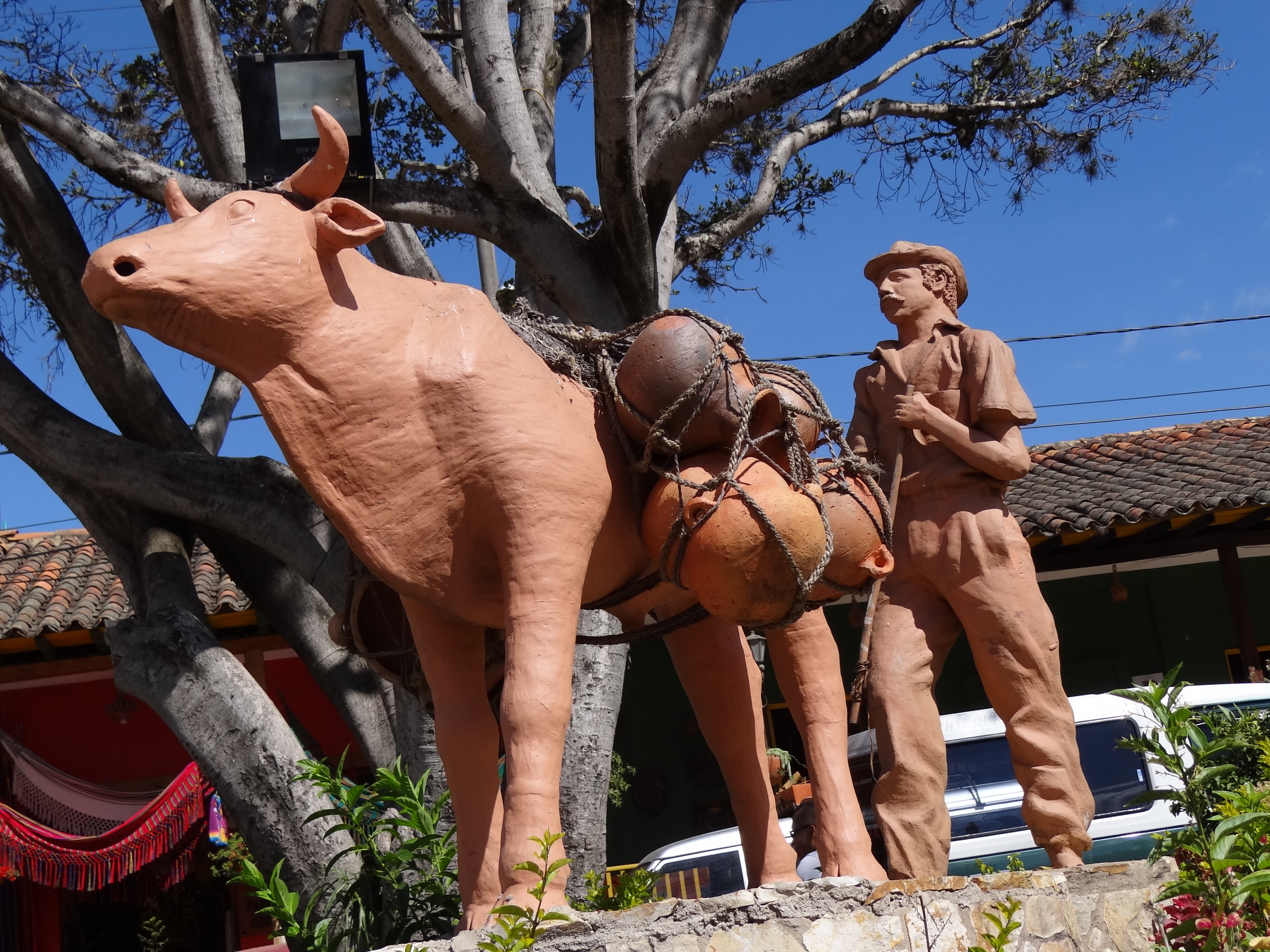
Clay sculpture

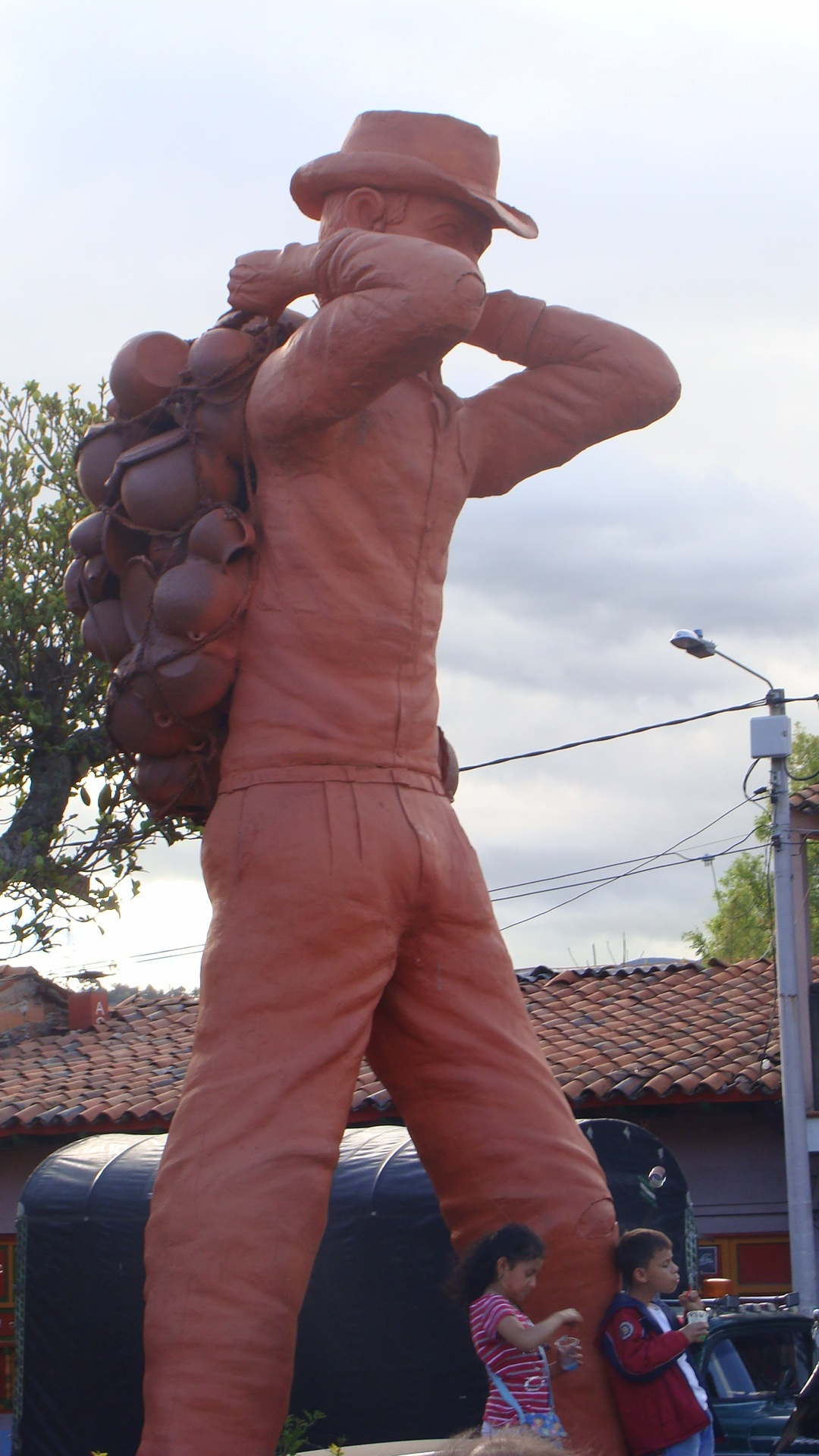
Ceramic sculpture
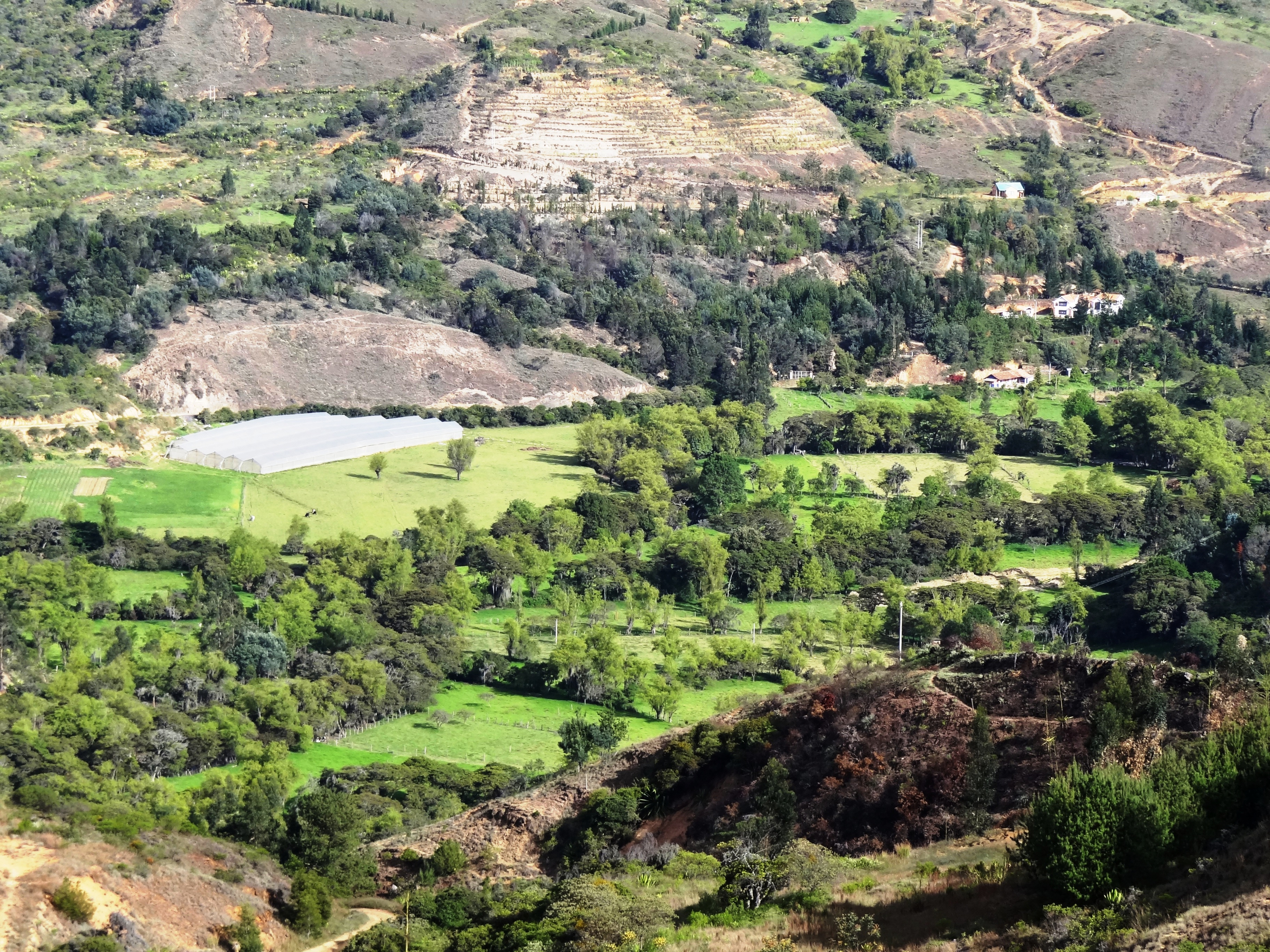
Rural area of Ráquira

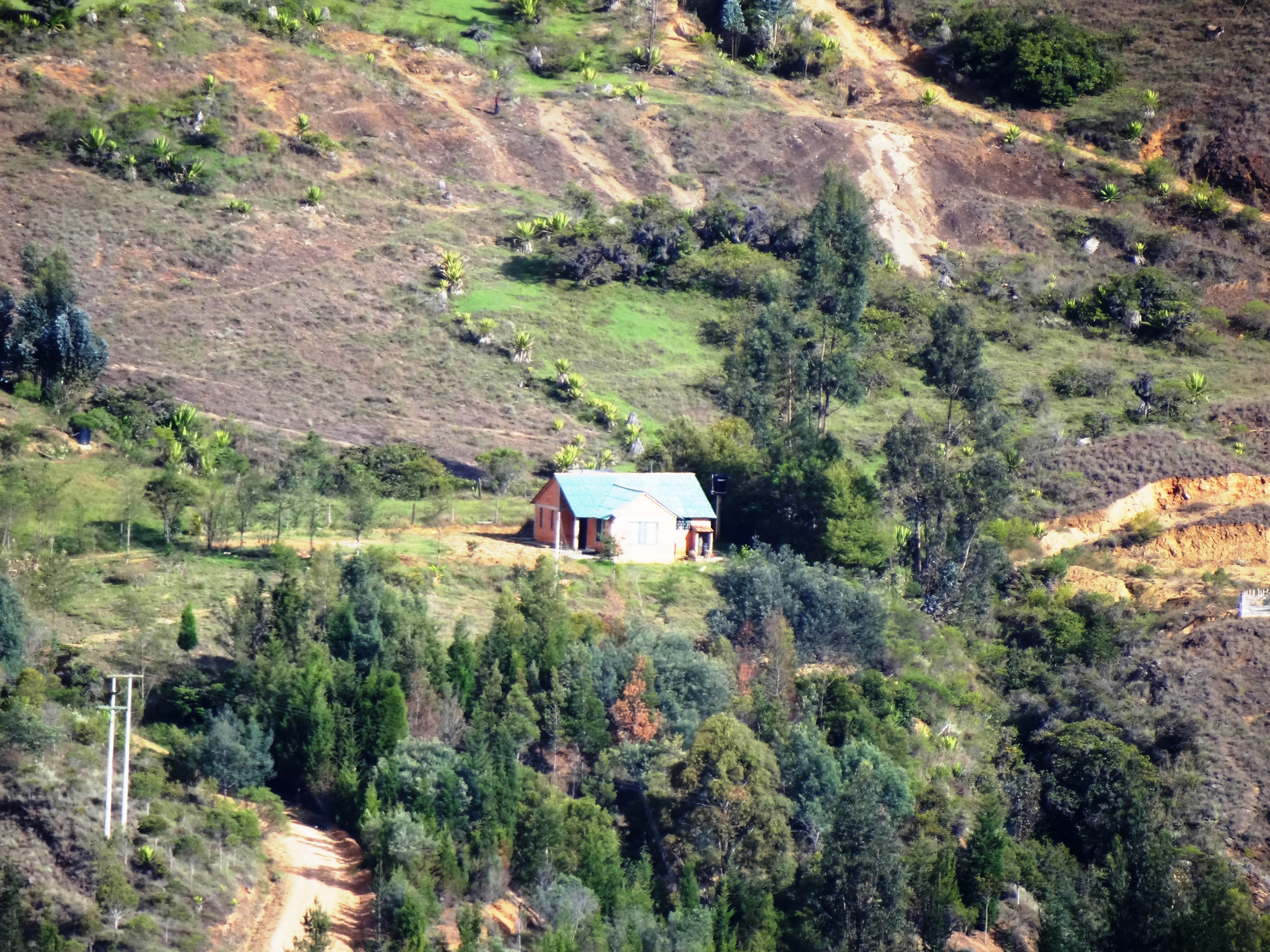
Farm in rural area

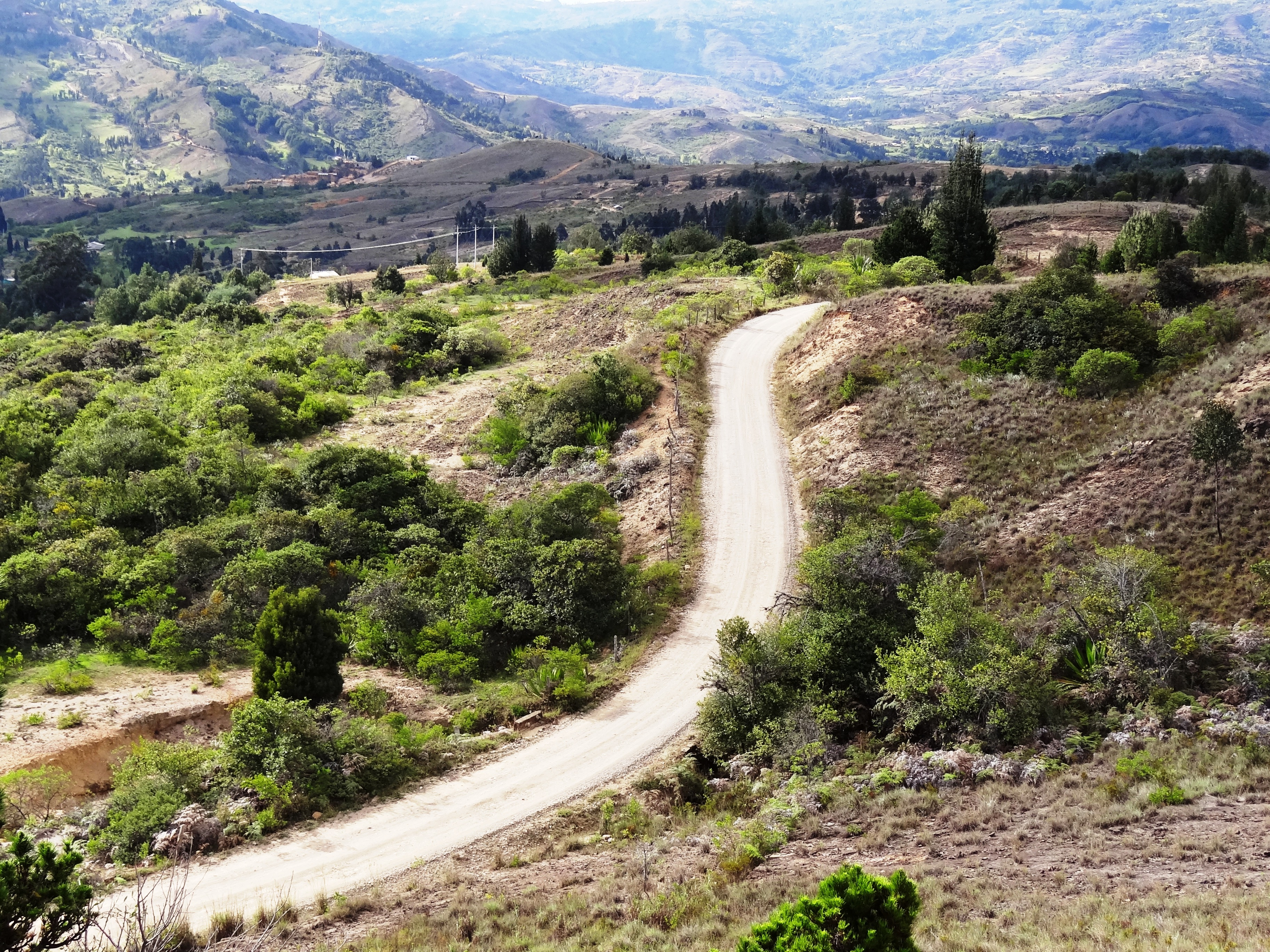
Road in rural area

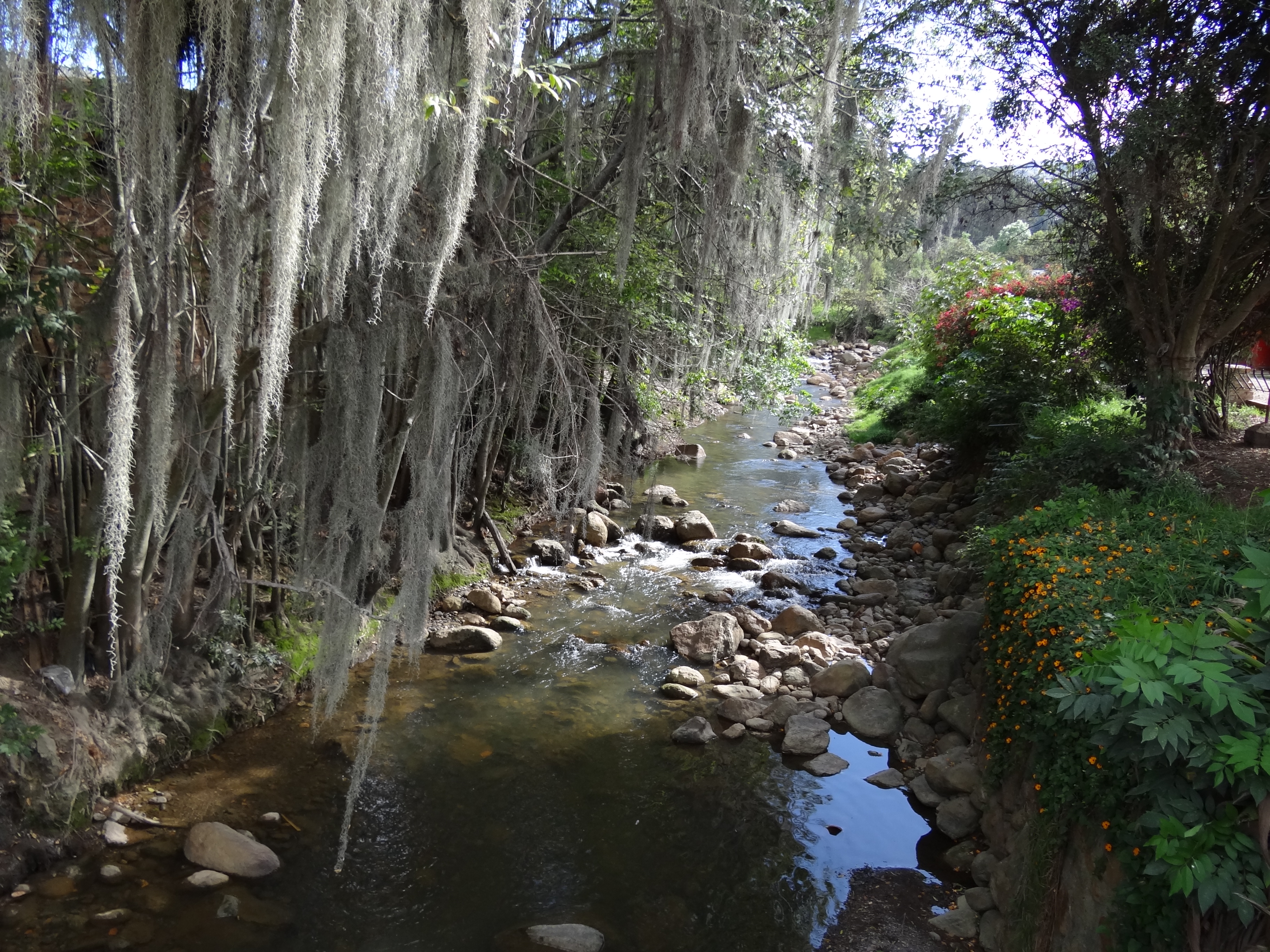
Ráquira River
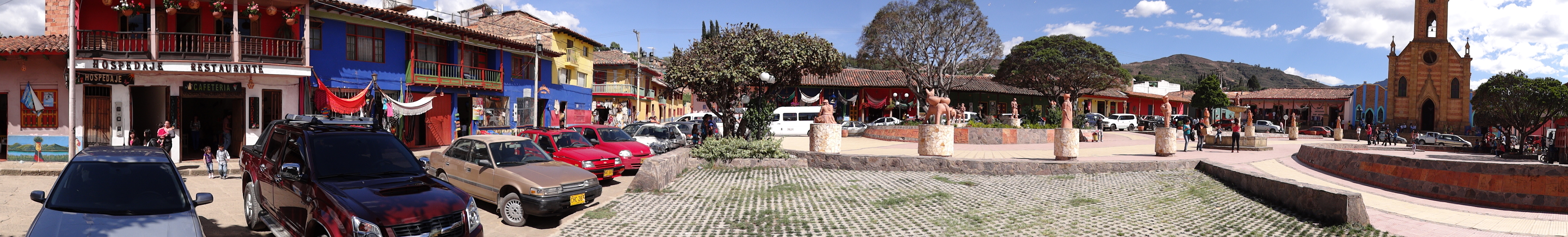
Panorama of central square and park Ráquira
