= Tinjacá =

Coordinates: 5°34′N 73°39′W

- Municipality and town
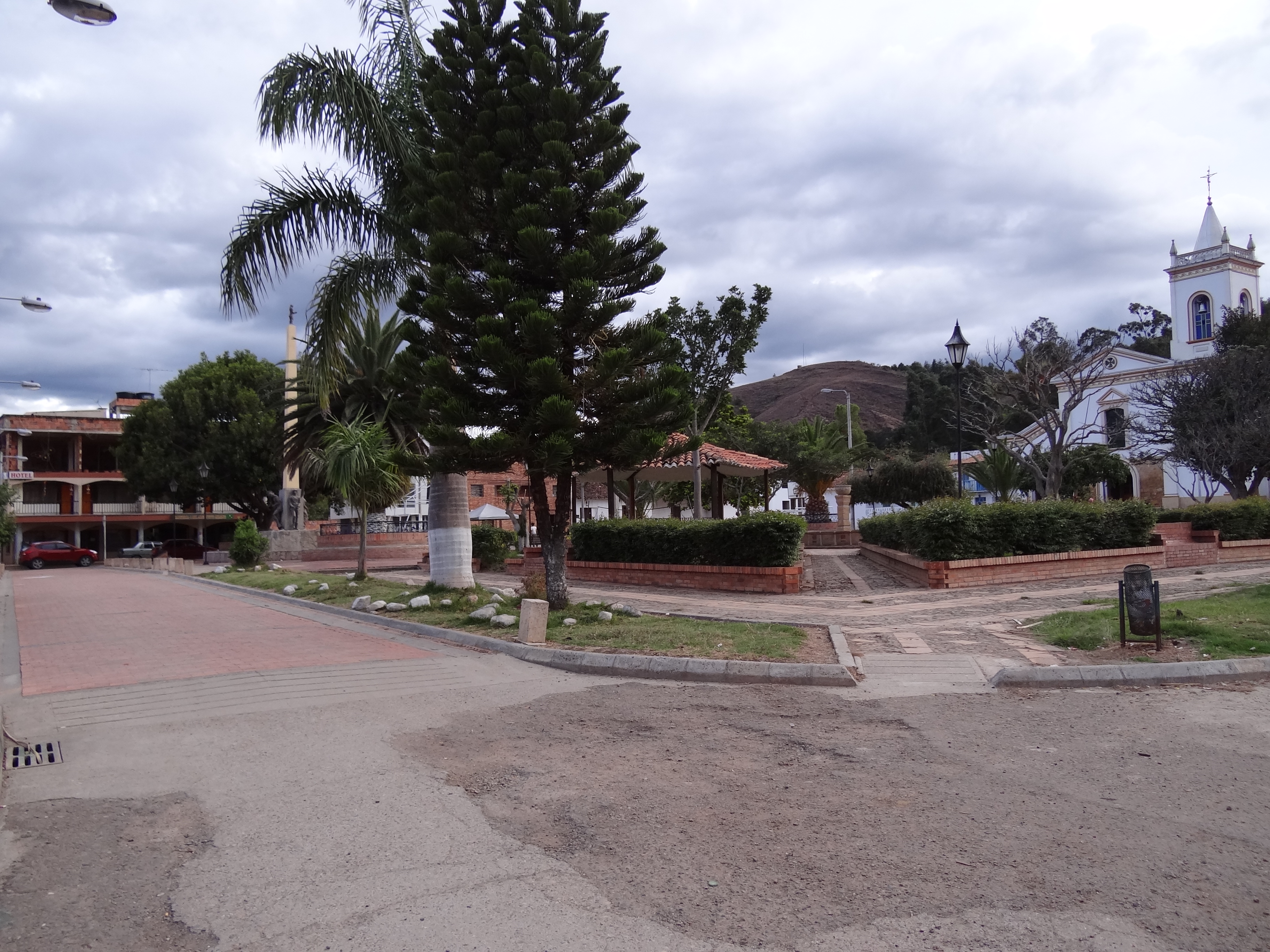
- Central square of Tinjacá

- Flag

- Location of the municipality and town of Tinjacá in the Boyacá Department of Colombia
- Country: Colombia
- Department: Boyacá Department
- Province: Ricaurte Province
- Founded: 7 November 1555

Government
  - Mayor: Alsilver Sierra Mendieta (2020-2023)

Area
  - Municipality and town: 79.2745 km^{2} (30.6081 sq mi)
  - Urban: 0.2601 km^{2} (0.1004 sq mi)
- Elevation: 2,175 m (7,136 ft)

Population (2015)
  - Municipality and town: 3,035
  - Density: 38.28/km^{2} (99.16/sq mi)
  - Urban: 455
- Time zone: UTC-5 (Colombia Standard Time)
- Website: Official website

Tinjacá is a town and municipality in Boyacá Department, Colombia, part of the subregion of the Ricaurte Province. Tinjacá is located on the Altiplano Cundiboyacense at a distance of 54 kilometres (34 mi) from the department capital Tunja. It borders Sutamarchán in the north, Ráquira in the south, Sáchica in the east and in the west Chiquinquirá and Saboyá.

== Etymology ==
Tinjacá is derived from Chibcha and means "Enclosure of the powerful lord".

== History ==
The area of Tinjacá before the Spanish conquest was part of the Muisca Confederation, a loose confederation of different Muisca rulers. The cacique of Tinjacá was loyal to the zaque of Hunza. Modern Tinjacá was founded on November 7, 1555.

== Economy ==
Main economical activities of Tinjacá are agriculture and livestock farming. Important agricultural products are onions, tomatoes, peaches, potatoes, maize and peas.

== Gallery ==
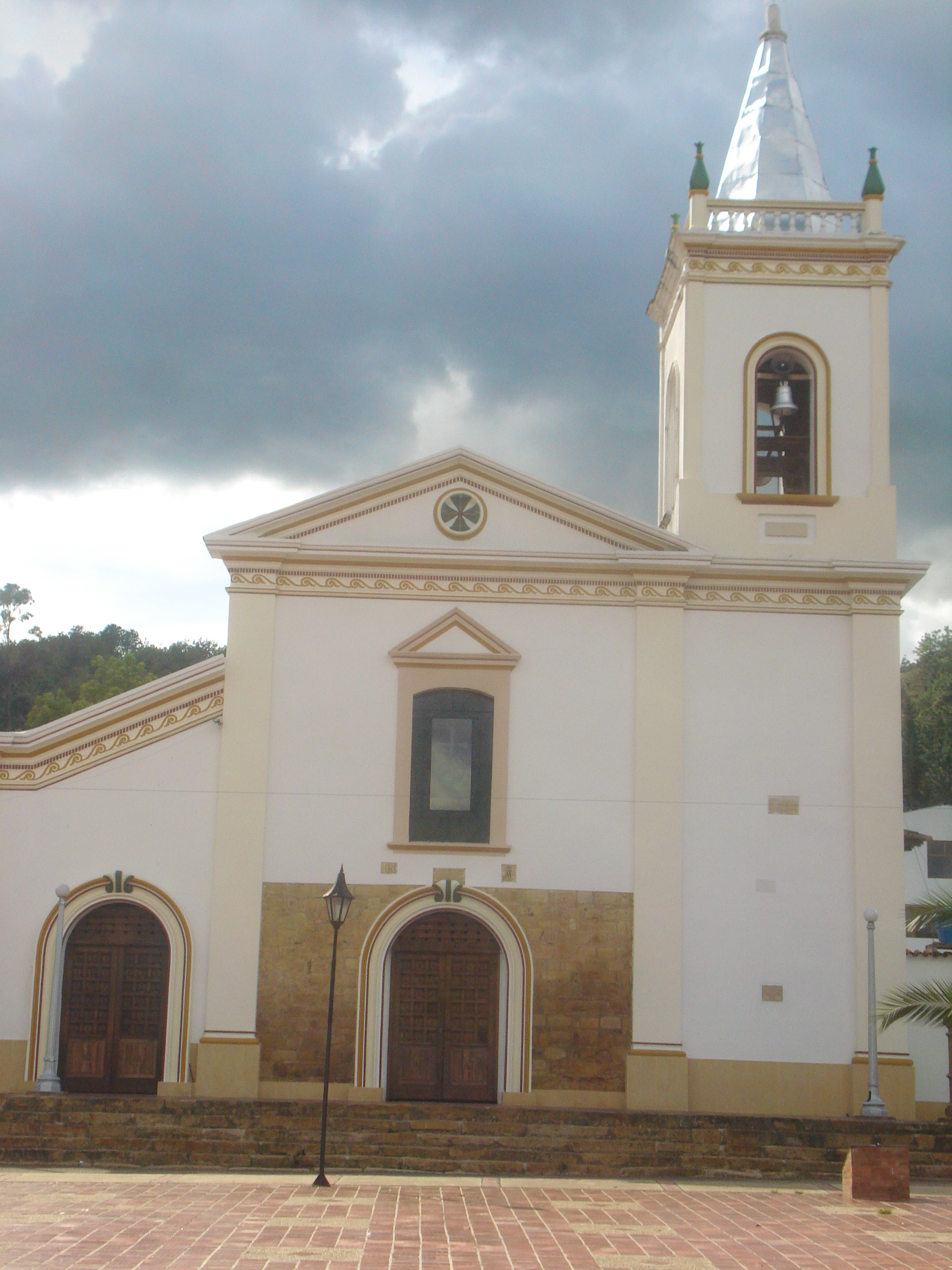
Church of Tinjacá

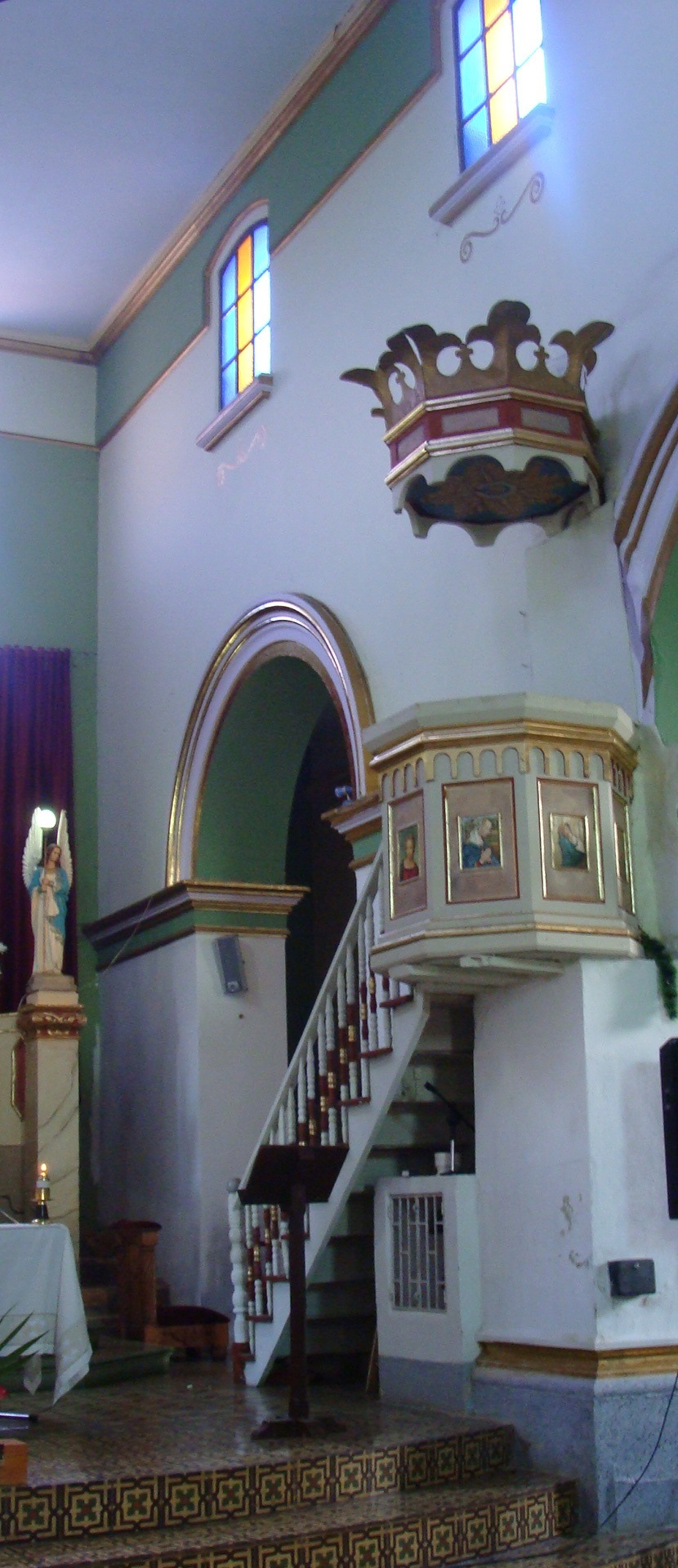
Church interior

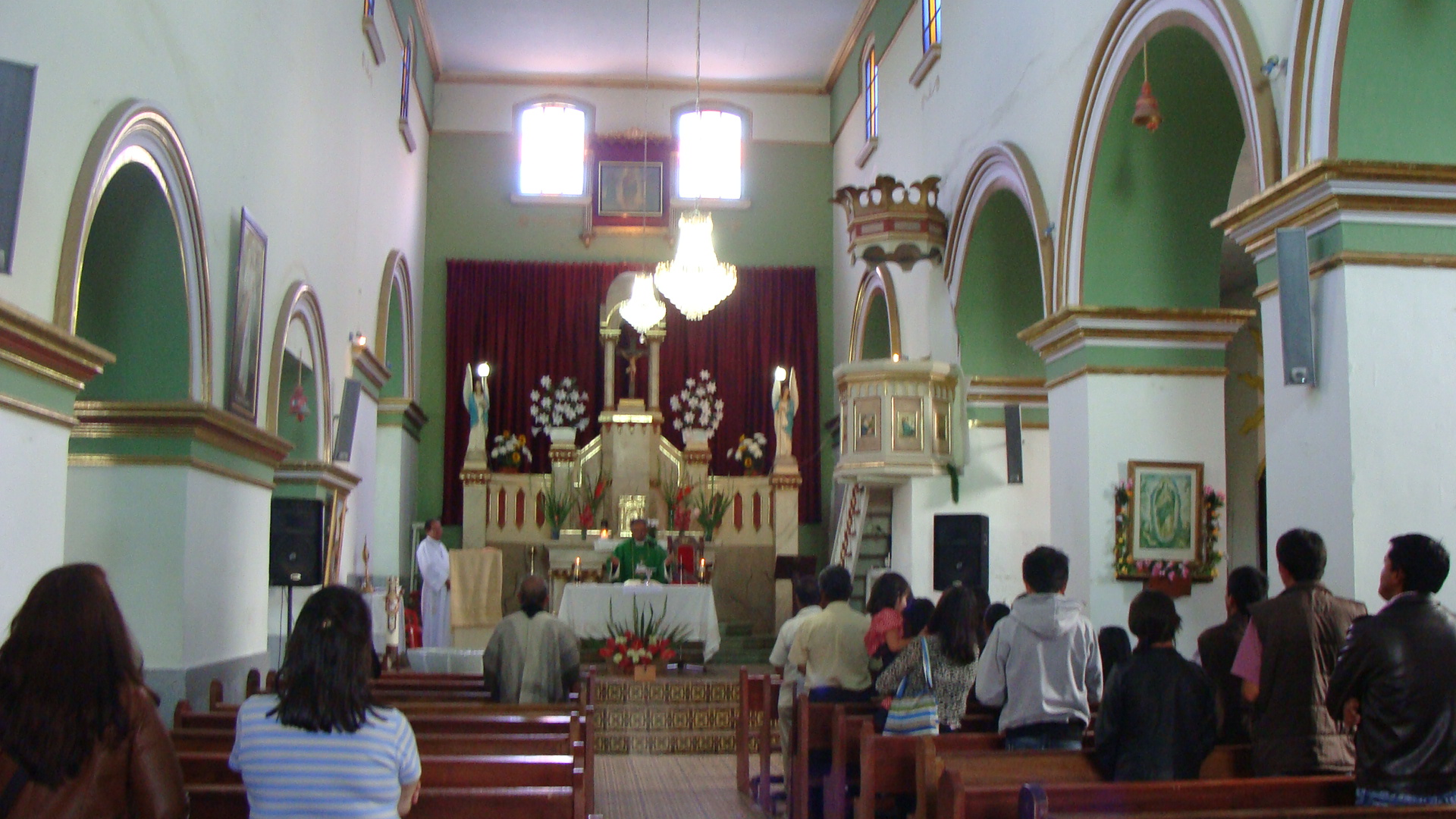
Church interior
