= Caldas, Boyacá =

Coordinates: 5.5575°N 73.8686°W

- Municipality and town
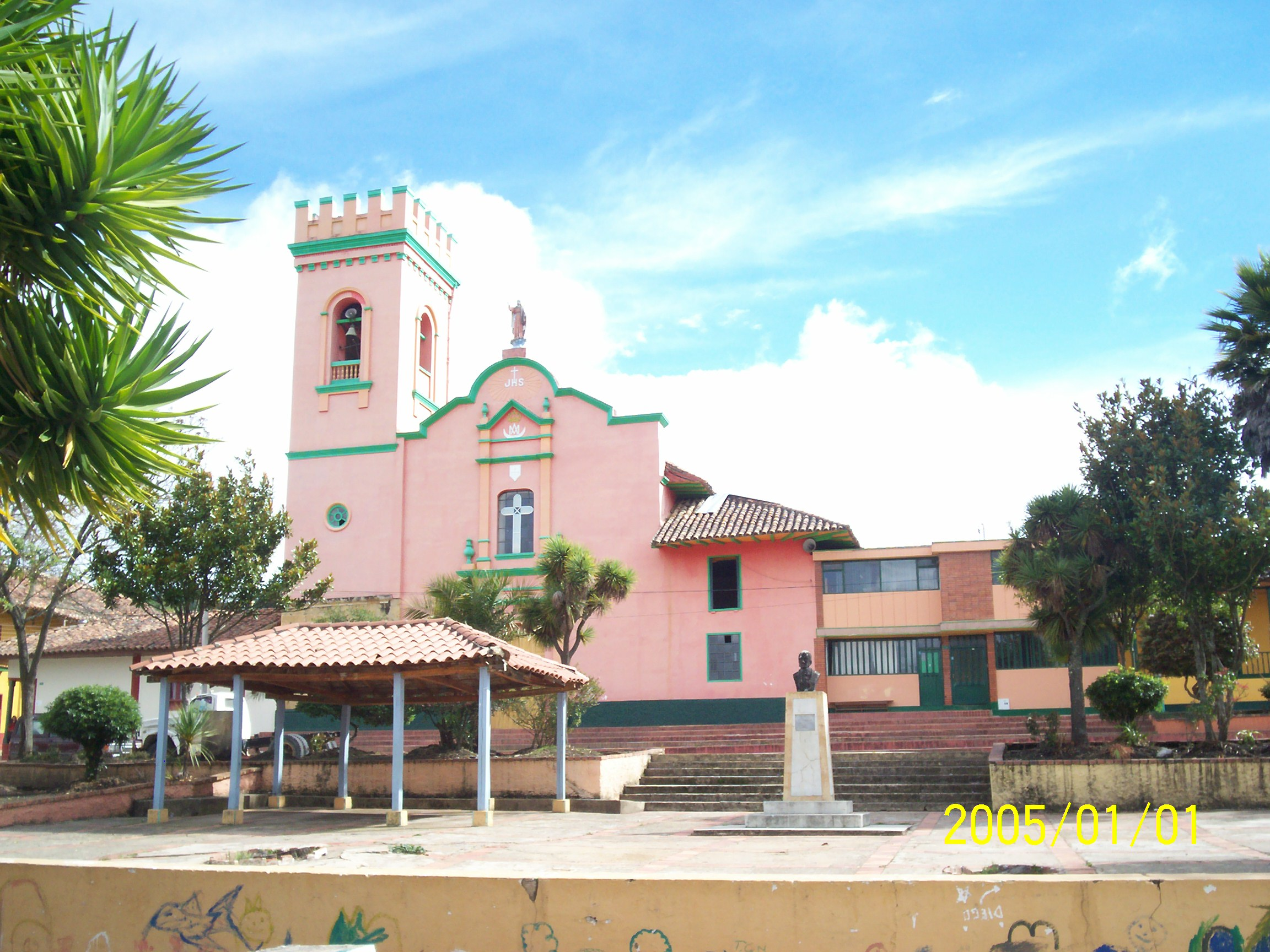

- Flag

- Location of the municipality and town of Caldas, Boyacá in the Boyacá Department of Colombia.
- Country: Colombia
- Department: Boyacá Department
- Province: Western Boyacá Province

Government
  - Mayor: Isnardo Alfonso Castellanos Peña (2020-2023)
- Time zone: UTC-5 (Colombia Standard Time)

Caldas (Spanish pronunciation: [ˈkal.das]) is a town and municipality in the Department of Boyacá, part of the subregion of the Western Boyacá Province in Colombia. The town is named after Neogranadine rebel Francisco José de Caldas.
