= La Victoria, Boyacá =

Coordinates: 5.52278°N 74.2328°W

- Municipality and town
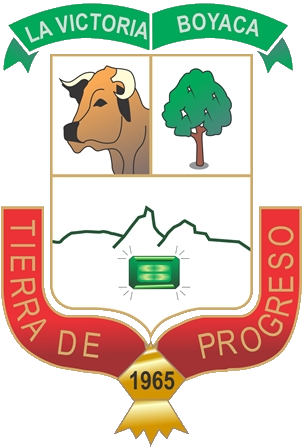
- Coat of arms

- Location of the municipality and town of La Victoria, Boyacá in the Boyacá Department of Colombia.
- Country: Colombia
- Department: Boyacá Department
- Province: Western Boyacá Province

Government
  - Mayor: Leonardo Vega Bustos (2020-2023)
- Time zone: UTC-5 (Colombia Standard Time)

La Victoria is a town and municipality in the Colombian Department of Boyacá, part of the subregion of the Western Boyacá Province.
