= Buenavista, Boyacá =

Coordinates: 5°30′41″N 73°56′31″W

- Municipality and town
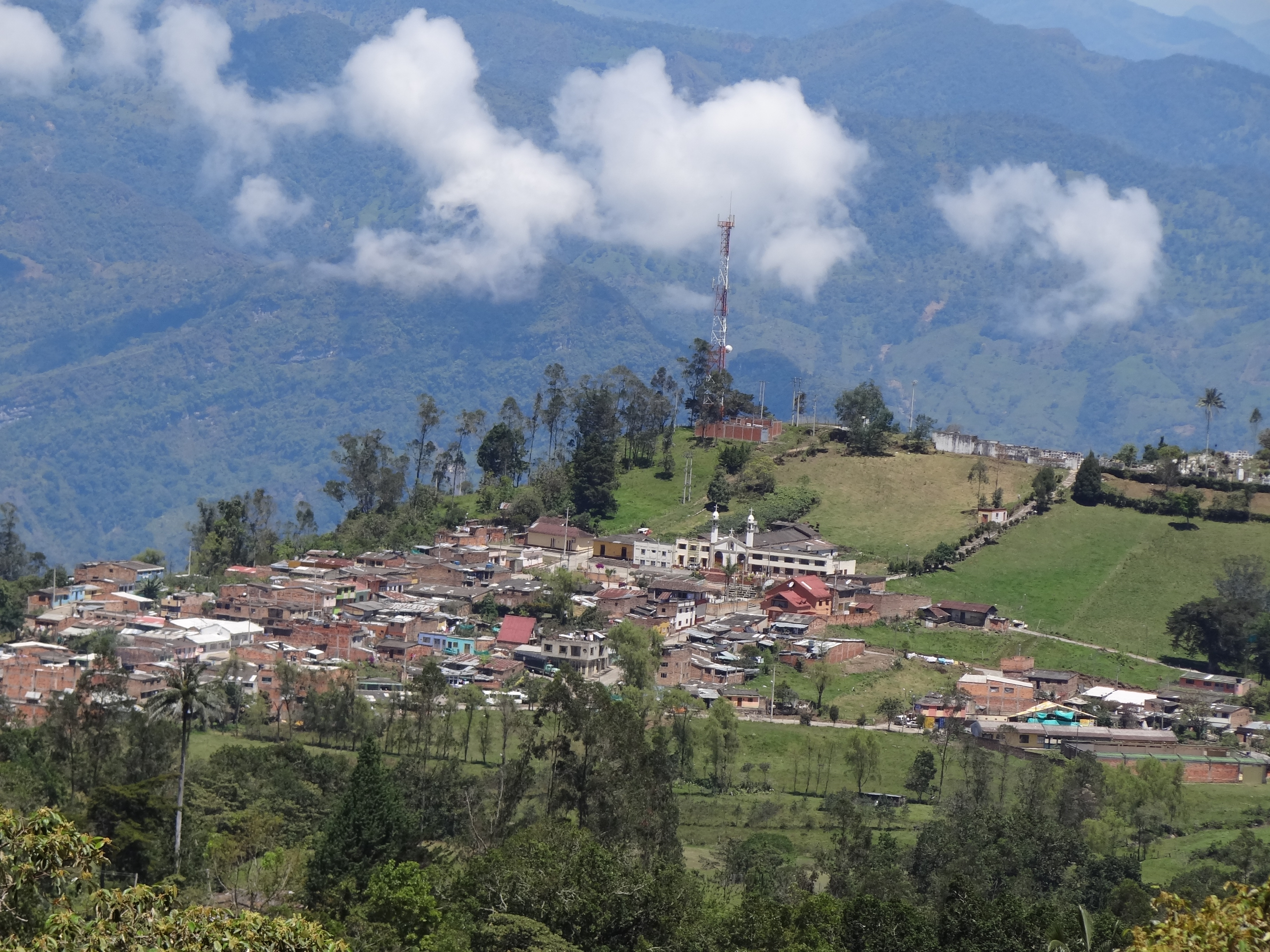

- Flag Coat of arms

- Location of the municipality and town of Buenavista, Boyacá in the Boyacá Department of Colombia.
- Country: Colombia
- Department: Boyacá Department
- Province: Western Boyacá Province

Government
  - Mayor: Miguel Antonio Castillo Barragán (2020-2023)
- Time zone: UTC-5 (Colombia Standard Time)

Buenavista is a town and municipality in the Colombian Department of Boyacá, part of the subregion of the Western Boyacá Province.

== Climate ==
Climate data for Buenavista, elevation 2,200 m (7,200 ft), (1981–2010)
Month	Jan	Feb	Mar	Apr	May	Jun	Jul	Aug	Sep	Oct	Nov	Dec	Year
Mean daily maximum °C (°F)	18.9 (66.0)	18.9 (66.0)	18.8 (65.8)	18.9 (66.0)	19.3 (66.7)	19.2 (66.6)	19.4 (66.9)	19.7 (67.5)	19.7 (67.5)	19.2 (66.6)	18.7 (65.7)	18.6 (65.5)	19.2 (66.6)
Daily mean °C (°F)	15.7 (60.3)	15.7 (60.3)	15.8 (60.4)	16.0 (60.8)	16.2 (61.2)	16.1 (61.0)	16.2 (61.2)	16.2 (61.2)	16.2 (61.2)	16.1 (61.0)	15.8 (60.4)	15.8 (60.4)	16 (61)
Mean daily minimum °C (°F)	9.4 (48.9)	9.8 (49.6)	10.1 (50.2)	10.2 (50.4)	10.6 (51.1)	10.1 (50.2)	9.9 (49.8)	9.8 (49.6)	9.9 (49.8)	10.3 (50.5)	10.1 (50.2)	9.5 (49.1)	10.0 (50.0)
Average precipitation mm (inches)	85.7 (3.37)	107.1 (4.22)	175.5 (6.91)	207.7 (8.18)	140.3 (5.52)	75.8 (2.98)	62.4 (2.46)	64.8 (2.55)	128.3 (5.05)	220.5 (8.68)	220.4 (8.68)	96.1 (3.78)	1,525.5 (60.06)
Average precipitation days (≥ 1.0 mm)	14	16	20	21	18	13	12	12	14	22	20	17	190
Average relative humidity (%)	88	88	89	90	89	89	88	88	87	89	89	90	89
Source: Instituto de Hidrologia Meteorologia y Estudios Ambientales
