= Briceño, Boyacá =

Briceño
- Municipality and town
- Flag

- Location of the municipality and town of Briceño in Boyacá
- Coordinates: 5.7°N 73.9333°W
- Country: Colombia
- Department: Boyacá Department
- Province: Western Boyacá Province

Government
  - Mayor: Beatriz Páez Castellanos (2020-2023)

Area
  - Total: 49 km^{2} (19 sq mi)

Population (2022)
  - Total: 2,192
  - Density: 45/km^{2} (120/sq mi)
- Time zone: UTC-5 (Colombia Standard Time)

Briceño is a town and municipality in the Colombian Department of Boyacá, part of the subregion of the Western Boyacá Province.
