= Quípama =

Coordinates: 5°31′N 74°11′W

- Municipality and town
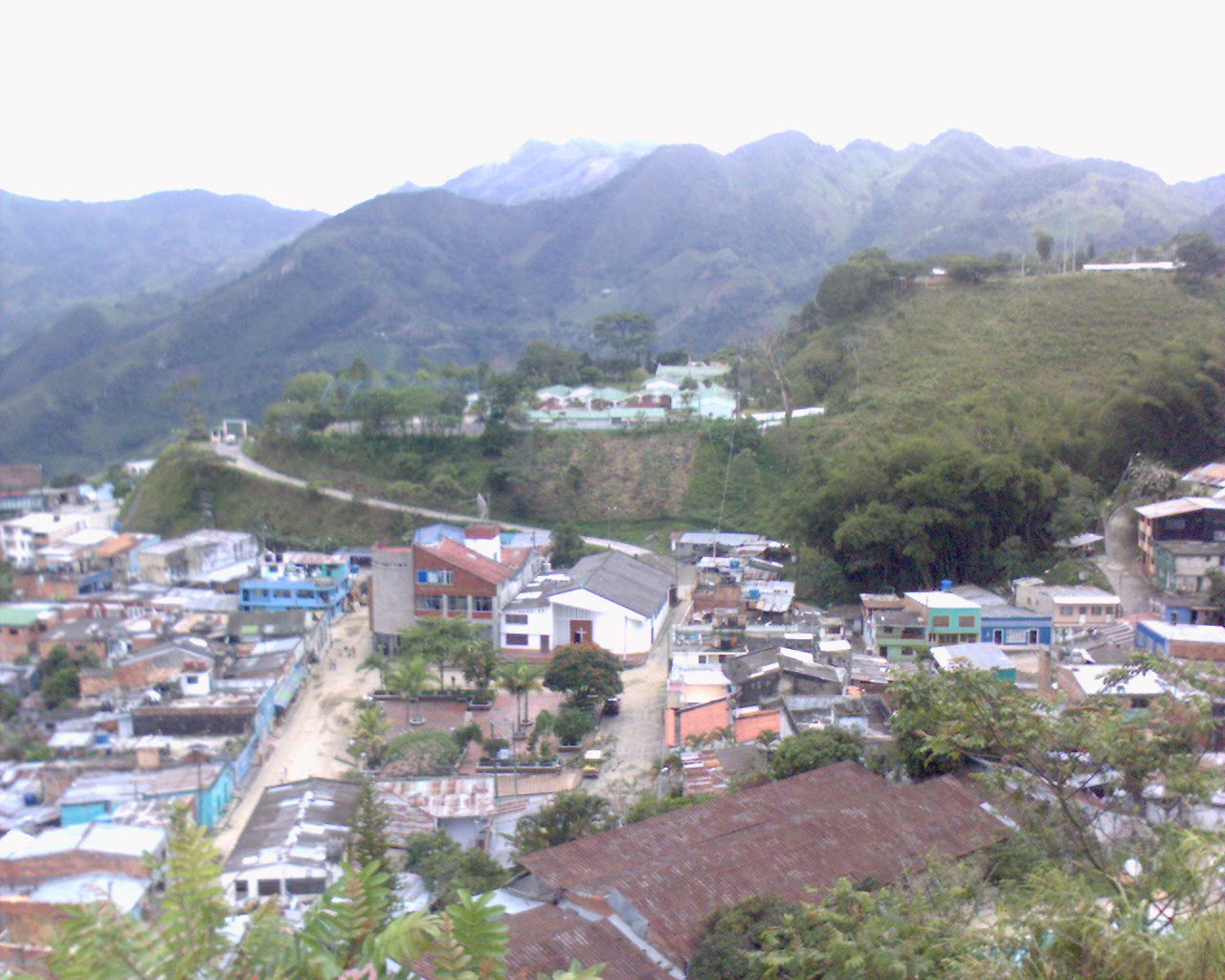
- View of Quípama

- Flag

- Location of the municipality and town of Quipama in the Boyacá Department of Colombia.
- Country: Colombia
- Department: Boyacá
- Province: Western Boyacá Province

Government
  - Mayor: Carlos Alberto Ávila Cepeda (2020-2023)
- Elevation: 1,200 m (3,900 ft)
- Time zone: UTC-5 (Colombia Standard Time)

Quípama is a town and municipality in the Colombian Department of Boyacá, part of the subregion of the Western Boyacá Province.

It is home of one of the largest emerald mines in the world.

== Climate ==
Quípama has a tropical rainforest climate (Af) with heavy to very heavy rainfall year-round.

Climate data for Quípama (Furatena Airport), elevation 1,250 m (4,100 ft), (1981–2010)
Month	Jan	Feb	Mar	Apr	May	Jun	Jul	Aug	Sep	Oct	Nov	Dec	Year
Mean daily maximum °C (°F)	27.0 (80.6)	27.0 (80.6)	27.2 (81.0)	26.9 (80.4)	26.9 (80.4)	27.3 (81.1)	27.9 (82.2)	28.1 (82.6)	27.5 (81.5)	27.0 (80.6)	26.8 (80.2)	26.8 (80.2)	27.3 (81.1)
Daily mean °C (°F)	21.8 (71.2)	21.8 (71.2)	21.7 (71.1)	21.6 (70.9)	21.7 (71.1)	21.7 (71.1)	21.8 (71.2)	22.1 (71.8)	21.9 (71.4)	21.7 (71.1)	21.5 (70.7)	21.7 (71.1)	21.8 (71.2)
Mean daily minimum °C (°F)	17.7 (63.9)	17.7 (63.9)	17.8 (64.0)	17.6 (63.7)	17.8 (64.0)	17.8 (64.0)	17.6 (63.7)	17.6 (63.7)	17.6 (63.7)	17.8 (64.0)	17.9 (64.2)	17.9 (64.2)	17.7 (63.9)
Average precipitation mm (inches)	129.0 (5.08)	208.4 (8.20)	314.8 (12.39)	365.8 (14.40)	338.3 (13.32)	239.6 (9.43)	198.2 (7.80)	191.8 (7.55)	274.9 (10.82)	391.2 (15.40)	283.1 (11.15)	179.1 (7.05)	3,008 (118.4)
Average precipitation days (≥ 1.0 mm)	17	17	22	23	25	21	19	18	22	24	22	19	238
Average relative humidity (%)	84	85	86	87	87	85	83	82	84	85	86	86	85
Source: Instituto de Hidrologia Meteorologia y Estudios Ambientales

== See also ==
- Las Pavas
- Muzo, Chivor, Somondoco
