= Coper, Boyacá =

Coper
- Municipality and town
- Flag

- Location of the municipality and town of Coper in Boyacá
- Coordinates: 5°29′N 74°03′W
- Country: Colombia
- Department: Boyacá
- Province: Western Boyacá Province

Government
  - Mayor: Aurora del Carmen Nieto Molina (2020-2023)
- Time zone: UTC-5 (Colombia Standard Time)

Coper is a town and municipality in the Colombian Department of Boyacá, part of the subregion of the Western Boyacá Province.

== Climate ==
Coper has a tropical rainforest climate (Af) with heavy to very heavy rainfall year-round.

Climate data for Coper
Month	Jan	Feb	Mar	Apr	May	Jun	Jul	Aug	Sep	Oct	Nov	Dec	Year
Mean daily maximum °C (°F)	28.3 (82.9)	28.5 (83.3)	28.6 (83.5)	28.6 (83.5)	28.4 (83.1)	28.2 (82.8)	29.0 (84.2)	28.8 (83.8)	28.4 (83.1)	27.8 (82.0)	27.6 (81.7)	27.7 (81.9)	28.3 (83.0)
Daily mean °C (°F)	23.3 (73.9)	23.6 (74.5)	23.8 (74.8)	24.1 (75.4)	23.9 (75.0)	23.5 (74.3)	23.8 (74.8)	23.6 (74.5)	23.3 (73.9)	23.2 (73.8)	23.0 (73.4)	23.0 (73.4)	23.5 (74.3)
Mean daily minimum °C (°F)	18.4 (65.1)	18.8 (65.8)	19.1 (66.4)	19.6 (67.3)	19.4 (66.9)	18.8 (65.8)	18.7 (65.7)	18.4 (65.1)	18.3 (64.9)	18.6 (65.5)	18.4 (65.1)	18.4 (65.1)	18.7 (65.7)
Average rainfall mm (inches)	207.7 (8.18)	224.4 (8.83)	312.7 (12.31)	383.6 (15.10)	350.1 (13.78)	172.4 (6.79)	114.5 (4.51)	138.9 (5.47)	249.2 (9.81)	428.8 (16.88)	403.1 (15.87)	286.0 (11.26)	3,271.4 (128.79)
Average rainy days	13	13	17	20	18	12	10	11	15	21	20	16	186
Source 1: IDEAM
Source 2: Climate-Data.org

== Born in Coper ==
- Winner Anacona, professional cyclist
