= Saboyá =

Coordinates: 5°42′N 73°46′W

- Municipality and town
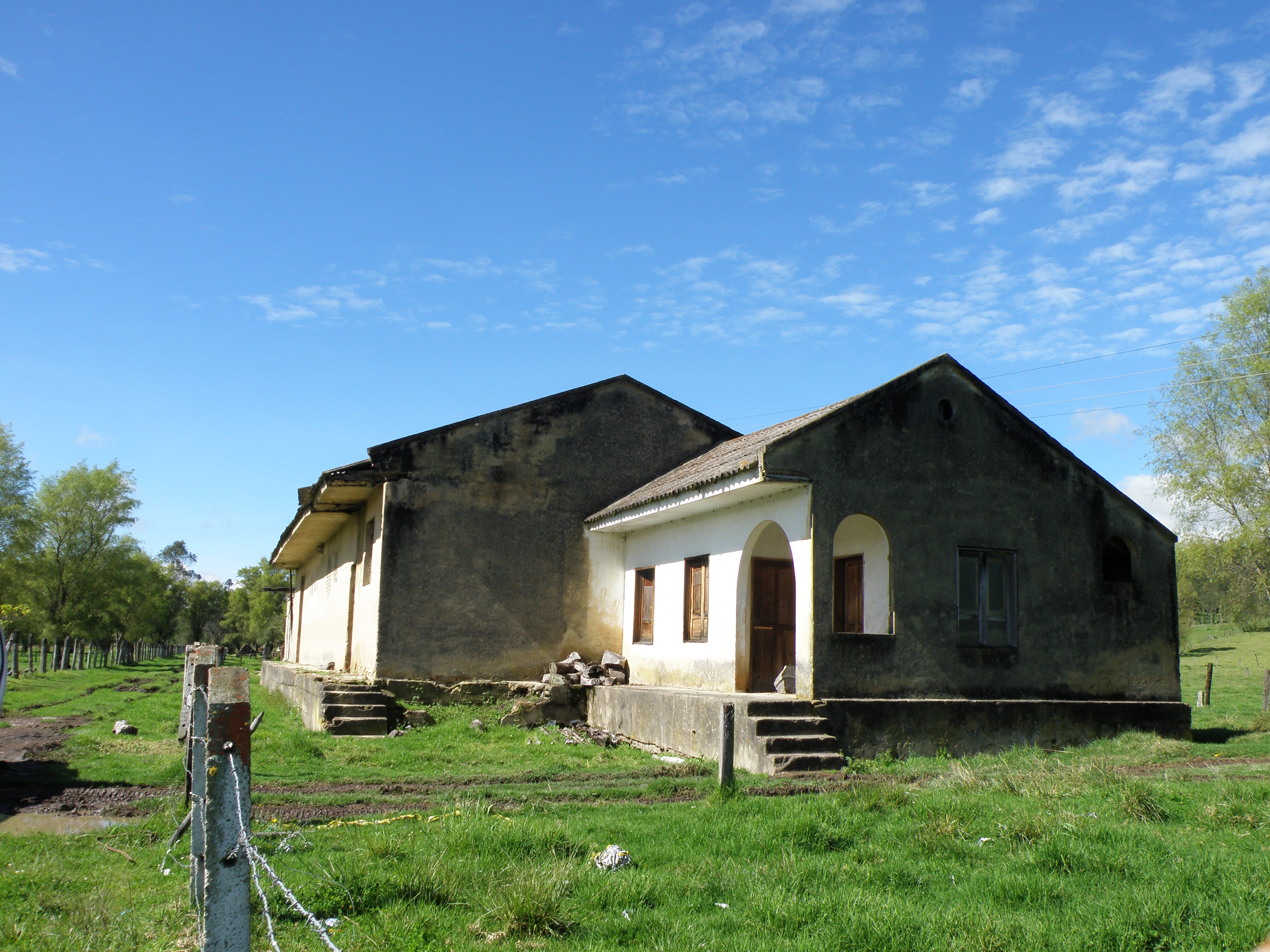
- Train station Saboyá

- Flag

- Location of the municipality and town of Saboyá in the Boyacá Department of Colombia.
- Country: Colombia
- Department: Boyacá Department
- Province: Western Boyacá Province
- Founded: 4 October 1556

Government
  - Mayor: Jeferson Leonardo Ortiz Sanabria (2020–2023)

Area
  - Municipality and town: 246.9 km^{2} (95.3 sq mi)
  - Urban: 0.1 km^{2} (0.039 sq mi)
- Elevation: 2,600 m (8,500 ft)

Population (2015)
  - Municipality and town: 12,372
  - Density: 50.11/km^{2} (129.8/sq mi)
  - Urban: 789
- Time zone: UTC-5 (Colombia Standard Time)
- Website: Official website

Saboyá is a town and municipality in the Western Boyacá Province, part of the Colombian department of Boyacá.

== Etymology ==
Saboyá is an Italian name brought by European colonizers.

== History ==
Before the Spanish conquest of the Muisca on the central highlands of the Colombian Andes, Saboyá was ruled by a cacique with the same name.

The first encomendero of Saboyá was Pedro de Galeano, brother of Martín Galeano and soldier in the army of Hernán Pérez de Quesada, brother of Spanish conquistador Gonzalo Jiménez de Quesada. Modern Saboyá was founded on October 4, 1556.

Simón Bolívar visited Saboyá on three occasions: January 2, 1821, September 6, 1827 and June 9, 1828.

== Economy ==
Main economical activities in Saboyá are agriculture and livestock farming. Among the agricultural products potatoes, maize and the fruits curuba, blackberries, tree tomatoes and strawberries are cultivated.
