= San Pablo de Borbur =

Coordinates: 5°45′N 74°05′W

- Municipality and town
- Flag

- Location of the municipality and town of San Pablo de Borbur in the Boyacá Department of Colombia.
- Country: Colombia
- Department: Boyacá Department
- Province: Western Boyacá Province

Government
  - Mayor: Carlos Alberto Castellanos Gómez (2024-2027)
- Elevation: 830 m (2,720 ft)

Population (Census 2018)
  - Total: 5,839
- Time zone: UTC-5 (Colombia Standard Time)

San Pablo de Borbur is a town and municipality in the Colombian Department of Boyacá, part of the subregion of the Western Boyacá Province. The three most important productive sectors are agriculture, livestock and mining, with the emerald being one of the representative elements of the region.
