= Pauna =

Coordinates: 5°40′N 73°59′W

- Municipality and town
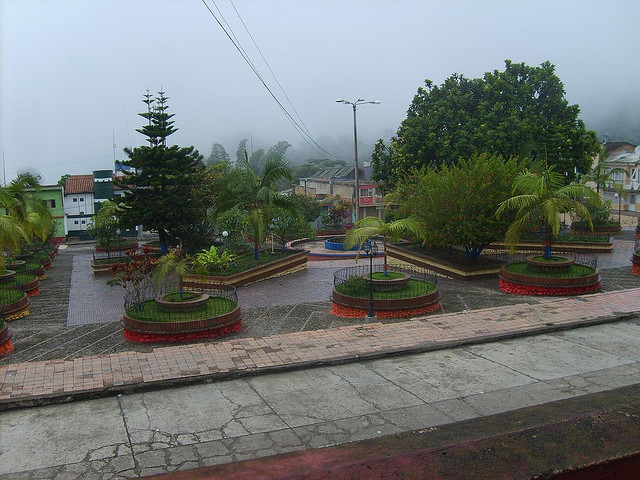

- Flag

- Location of the municipality and town of Pauna in the Boyacá Department of Colombia.
- Country: Colombia
- Department: Boyacá Department
- Province: Western Boyacá Province

Government
  - Mayor: Henry Iván Matallana Torres (2020-2023)

Population (Census 2018)
  - Total: 6,355
- Time zone: UTC-5 (Colombia Standard Time)

Pauna is a town and municipality in the Colombian Department of Boyacá, part of the subregion of the Western Boyacá Province.
