= Las Pavas =

Colombian emerald mining area

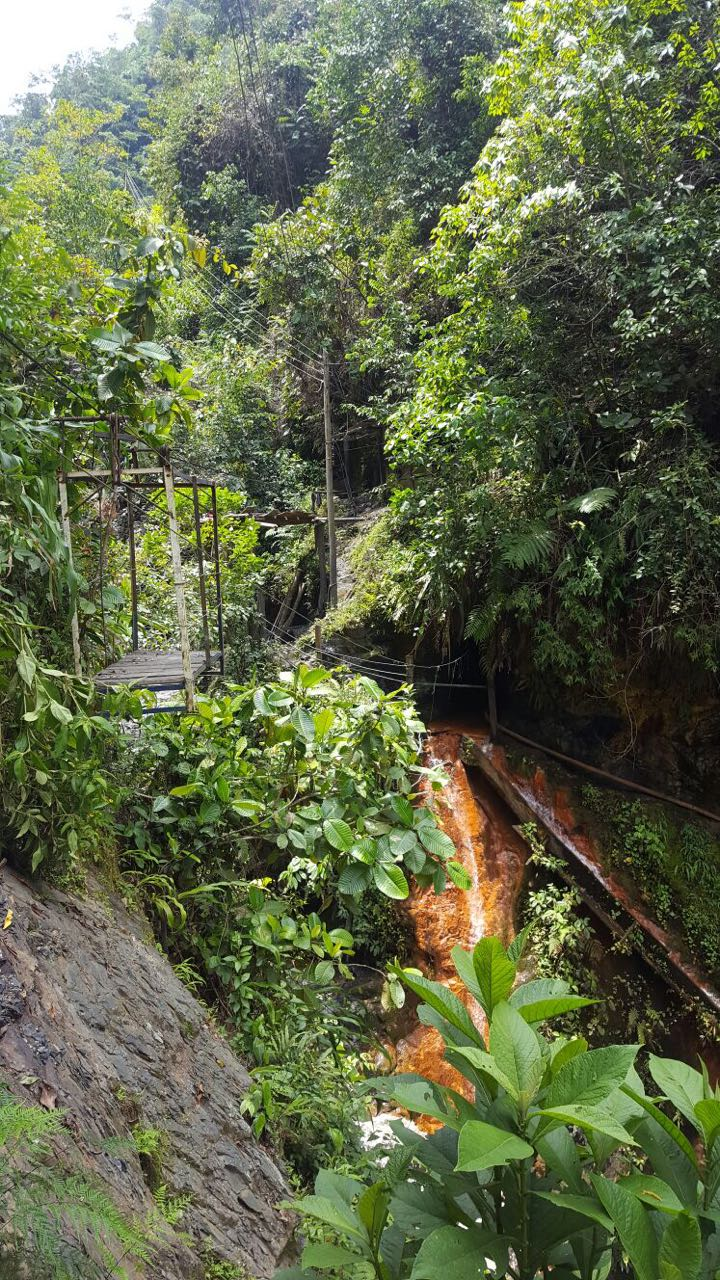
- Las Pavas area emerald mining Quípama and Muzo, Boyacá, Colombia

- Location within Colombia
- Location: Quípama, Muzo, Boyacá, Colombia; 05°33′28″N 74°13′07″W
- Products: Emeralds
- Opened: 2016
- Company: EMPAVA S.A.S
- Acquired: 2015

The Las Pavas, also called La Pava (Spanish: Mina La(s) Pava(s)), is a Colombian emerald mining area that is neighboring Colombia's largest emerald mine, Puerto Arturo. It is located 200 kilometres (120 mi) northwest of the capital Bogotá in the western emerald belt of Muzo, and about 235 kilometres (146 mi) west of Chivor, which is in the eastern emerald belt. The mining area spans the municipalities Quípama and Muzo.

== History ==
Colombia holds the world's largest resources of Class 1 emeralds, following that are Zambia's and Brazil's Class 3 emeralds. The Muzo emerald deposits are situated in the western foothills of the Eastern Ranges of the Colombian Andes. They lie about 8 kilometres (5.0 mi) by trail west of the village of Muzo in the Department of Boyacá, and embrace about eight great open cuts, closely grouped, occupying a portion of a steep walled valley, that of the Itoco, also called Quebrada del Desaguadero, an affluent of the Minero River which empties into the northward-flowing Magdalena, the great artery of commerce for central Colombia.

The emeralds occur at other points in the mountainous region of Boyacá, not only the Muzo locality has been productive but Coscuez, La Pita, Chivor and Peñas Blancas have been highly active in modern times. The Somondoco emerald veins and those of Coscuez are important historically and enjoy the reputation of being very rich. The total number of emerald localities in Boyacá has been stated to be 157 but this figure is probably a rough approximation. The emerald belts West and East are situated over a total of 99,000 hectares (240,000 acres), current licenses and production are only focused on 9000 hectares. Moreover, up until the 1970s emeralds in South America were only known to occur in Colombia. Since the 1970s, Brazil (Class 3) has become a recognized producer of emeralds albeit of a lower quality than Colombia. It has been reported, in Colombia near Bolívar, Vélez, Department of Santander, and tradition points to the Manta Valley near Puerto Viejo in Peru as a source, but it seems probable that all the "Peruvian" emeralds came from the Colombian deposits. The Muzo emerald deposits are believed to potentially represent the single largest source of easily mined high quality emeralds in the world.

Between January and September 2016, Colombia exported more than 279,000 cut carats of emeralds, representing an international market value of more than $107,000,000.

== Geology of Las Pavas ==
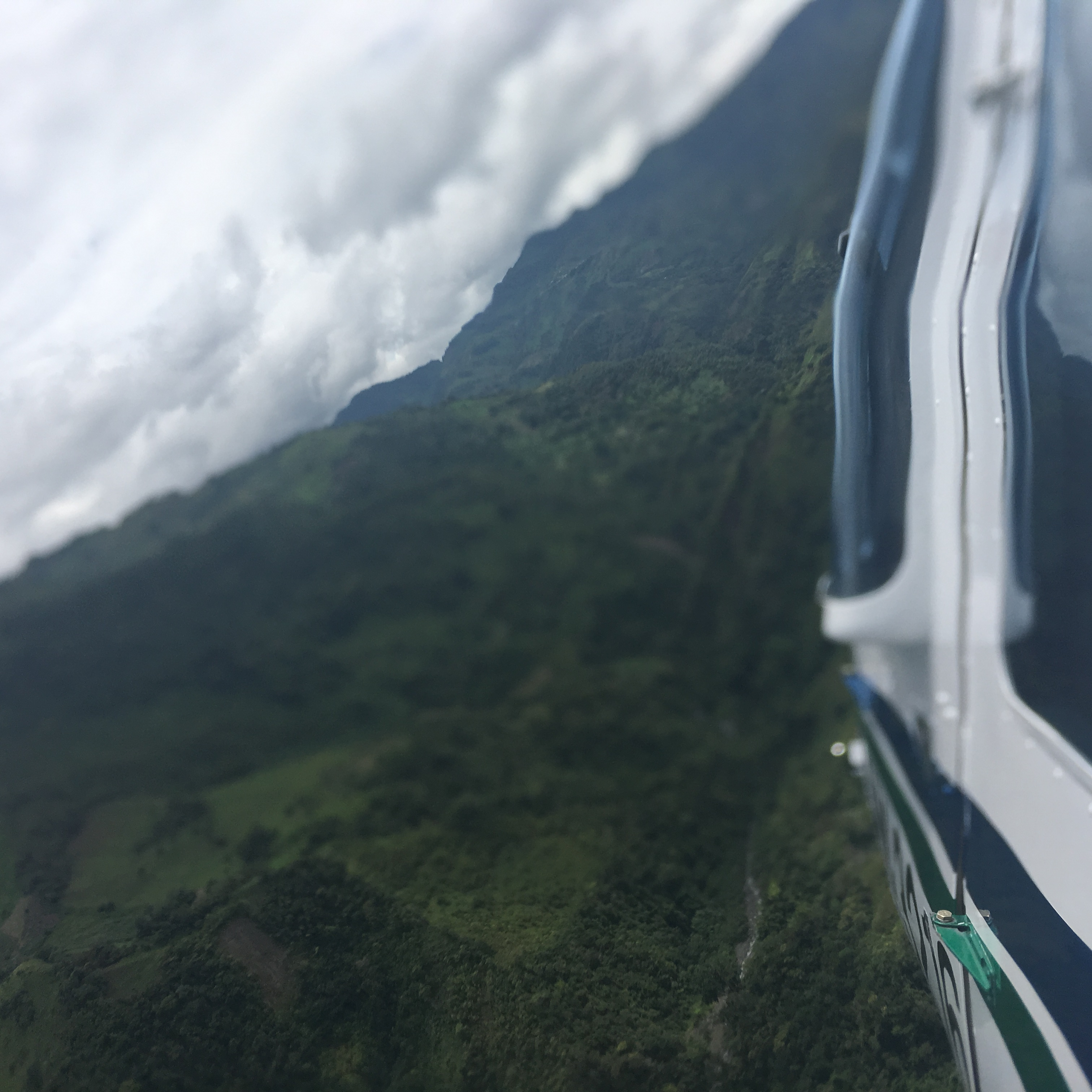
Las Pavas geological fieldtrip 2016

The Colombian emerald veins are located on the eastern and western flanks of the Eastern Cordillera of Colombia and account for 70-90% of annual global supply. Although there are additional sources for emeralds globally, Colombian emeralds are characterized for their superior transparency. The Eastern Cordillera is located in the northern Andean orogenic belt in the central portion of Colombia and consists of fold and thrust belts that resulted from active compressional tectonics since the middle Miocene. Originally a large Mesozoic basin, the Cordillera is composed of geological formations comprising interbedded sandstones, limestones, black shales and evaporites. The perspective formations in the district are the Muzo and Rosablanca, that are lithologically similar. These formations consist of sequences of limestones, shales, siltstones and sandstones of variable thickness. The Rosablanca unit is significantly thicker throughout the basin and contains a greater amount of limestone interbedded with shales.

Emeralds are typically found in calcite-dolomite veins with minor pyrite, ankerite, albite, and quartz. These veins are the product of intrusive hydrothermal fluids and metasomatic fluid interaction followed by deposition in fractures that formed as a result of the tectonic activity in the belt. The metasomatic fluids appear to be derived from particular shale formations, which are likely the source of vanadium which is the cause of the vibrant colour characteristic and could be why only formations of a certain composition are perspective target horizons for emerald mineralization. Fluids flow along faults and/or fractures and are at least partially driven by pressure from thrust propagation. Through a drop in pressure, fluids are able to cool and crystallize forming the emeralds over time. From observations of several of the mines in the area, the mineralization is favoured in the fractures within an alteration halo around large regional faults in particular formations. For example, where the Itaco Fault interacts with the Muzo Formation of Las Pavas, emeralds are formed.

Las Pavas is an area with unique mineralization and strong untested potential. The area is currently producing emeralds of a consistent quality and size. These emeralds are produced from a unique fold-hinge style of mineralization, not observed on other projects in the district, which is related to the Alto La Chapa anticline. Existing exploration accesses the unique mineralization on 4 different levels, demonstrating good continuity, this target remains open at depth. The untapped potential on the property is the 1.4 kilometres (0.87 mi) of extent along the strike of the Itaco Fault, which represents the host structural corridor for potential mineralization, hosted in the correct Muzo Formation, as mined in the rest of the district.

=== Muzo Formation ===
The Muzo Formation (K1m - Hauterivian-Barremian age) is a unit outcropping in the sector of Las Pavas, Peñas Blancas, and Coscuez. It also appears in Vélez, Chiquinquirá, and La Palma. The formation is present in the flanks of the La Chapa-Borbur anticlinal, also observed in the syncline of Otanche, in the sector of Coscuez, in the region of Muzo and Calcetero, and also part of the syncline of El Almendro and forms the nucleus of the Pauna anticlinal.

This unit houses most of the emerald-producing mines in the region, such as the Coscuez area, with additionally unexplored areas. The Muzo Formation is a generally calcareous sequence, however to the north of the Ibacapí Fault, it is observed to be weathered, and its calcareous composition is not recognized. To the north of Pauna, it has a siliceous character. In general, it is composed of dark gray calcareous claystones with intercalated sandstone lenses and limestone concretions. The formation commonly contains pyrite and calcite veins. These siltstones are interspersed with sandy siltstones and quartz-rich sandstones. Towards the middle of the segment claystones occur and albitized limestone, at this level appear a brecciated and mineralized zone with veins of calcite and sheets of oxidized sulphides. The upper part of the segment is interspersed with layers of gray claystones with layers of siltstones containing fossilized ammonite molds. At the bottom of this unit is the La Marina mine and to the south the emerald mines of La Pita, Consorcio, Totumos, Polveros and others. The lowermost calcareous package becomes thicker towards the south; as well as in the La 22 mine La Pita. The unit has a thickness of 2 metres (6.6 ft), and in the sector of Totumos and Polveros reaches 45 metres (148 ft) in thickness. There, it is composed of intercalations of limestone (micrite) and sandy siltstones. The zone of hydrothermal breccias that is immediately above the calcareous rocks, in the Mine the Pita has a thickness of approximately 30 metres (98 ft) and in the sector of the Totumos mine can reach up to 50 metres (160 ft). This unit in the area of Coscuez and Muzo presents emeralds, here its characteristic remains limestone in layers of calcareous siltstones, interspersed with calcareous claystones. To the south of the area, this unit presents similar characteristics.

A stratigraphic column, logged along the La Palma-Yacopí road and published in 2001, shows this unit is composed of a black terrigenous marl with a solid appearance with black calcareous claystone intercalations. In the upper part, intercalations of black shale with gypsum flakes and abundant pyritic micritical concretions appear, some with ammonites.

== Mining licence of Las Pavas ==
The Las Pavas concession agreement is active and registered with the National Mining Agency of Colombia (ANM). The title holders of Las Pavas have a 30-year exploration and exploitation license, this title granted the titleholder the exclusive right to extract the corresponding minerals and to conduct the necessary efforts to explore, exploit, process, transport and ship the relevant minerals.

=== Safety and security ===
The safety of the mine is critical and is implemented by the owners EMPAVA S.A.S., operators and the National Mining Agency. All employees and visitors are obligated to wear safety helmets and steel-toed rubber boots on site. There is a visitors area to check in with security where it is made sure the visitor wears the safety equipment, also provided on-site.

The mining region, despite its poor reputation, is actually safe and community orientated, the violence is now a faint memory of the past. Security in the mine is a collaboration between private security companies, the National Police of Colombia and the National Army of Colombia. This presence provides for a very secure work place and community support, where by the police and military often participate in community social projects ranging from building homes, aqueducts and road maintenance.

== See also ==
- Colombian emeralds
- La Pita
- Muzo, Chivor, Somondoco
- Pre-Columbian Muzo and Muisca emerald mining

== Bibliography ==
- Branquet, Yannick; Laumonier, Bernard; Cheilletz, Alain; Giuliani, Gaston (1999), "Emeralds in the Eastern Cordillera of Colombia: Two tectonic settings for one mineralization" (PDF), Geology, 27 (7): 597–600, Bibcode:1999Geo....27..597B, doi:10.1130/0091-7613(1999)027<0597:EITECO>2.3.CO;2
- Giuliani, Gaston; Cheilletz, Alain; Arboleda, Carlos; Carrillo, Victor; Rueda, Félix; Baker, James H. (1995), "An evaporitic origin of the parent brines of Colombian emeralds: fluid inclusion and sulphur isotope evidence" (PDF), European Journal of Mineralogy, 7: 151–165, Bibcode:1995EJMin...7..151G, doi:10.1127/ejm/7/1/0151
- Ortega Medina, Laura Milena (2007), Tipología y condiciones de formaciónde las manifestaciones del sector esmeraldífero "Peña Coscuez" (municipio San Pablo de Borbur, Boyacá) (MSc.) (PDF), Universidad Industrial de Santander, pp. 1–121, archived from the original (PDF) on 2017-01-06
- Pignatelli, Isabella; Giuliani, Gaston; Ohnenstetter, Daniel; Agrosì, Giovanna; Mathieu, Sandrine; Morlot, Christophe; Branquet, Yannick (2015), "Colombian Trapiche Emeralds: Recent Advances in Understanding Their Formation", Gems & Gemology, LI: 222–259, doi:10.5741/GEMS.51.3.222
