= La Pita =

Emerald mine in Boyacá, Colombia

La Pita Mine
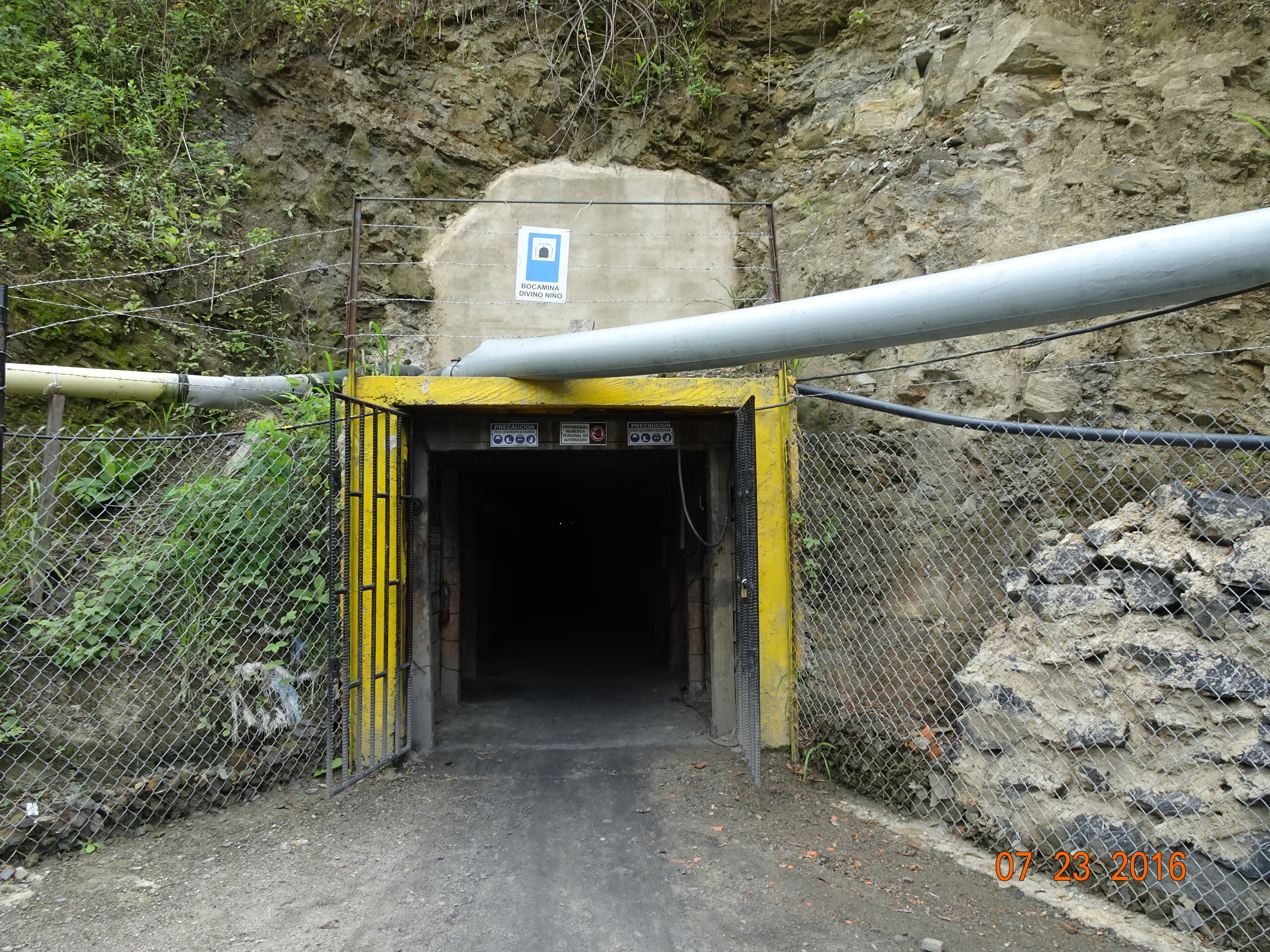
- Entrance to the mine

- Location within Colombia
- Location: Maripí, Muzo, Boyacá, Colombia; 05°34′N 74°04′W
- Products: Emeralds
- Opened: 2016
- Company: Zuliana De Esmeraldas Ltda
- Website: Website La Pita
- Acquired: 2015

La Pita is an emerald mine located in the western belt of the Colombian emerald mining area. It is owned and operated by the Colombian company, Zuliana De Esmeraldas Ltda.

== History ==
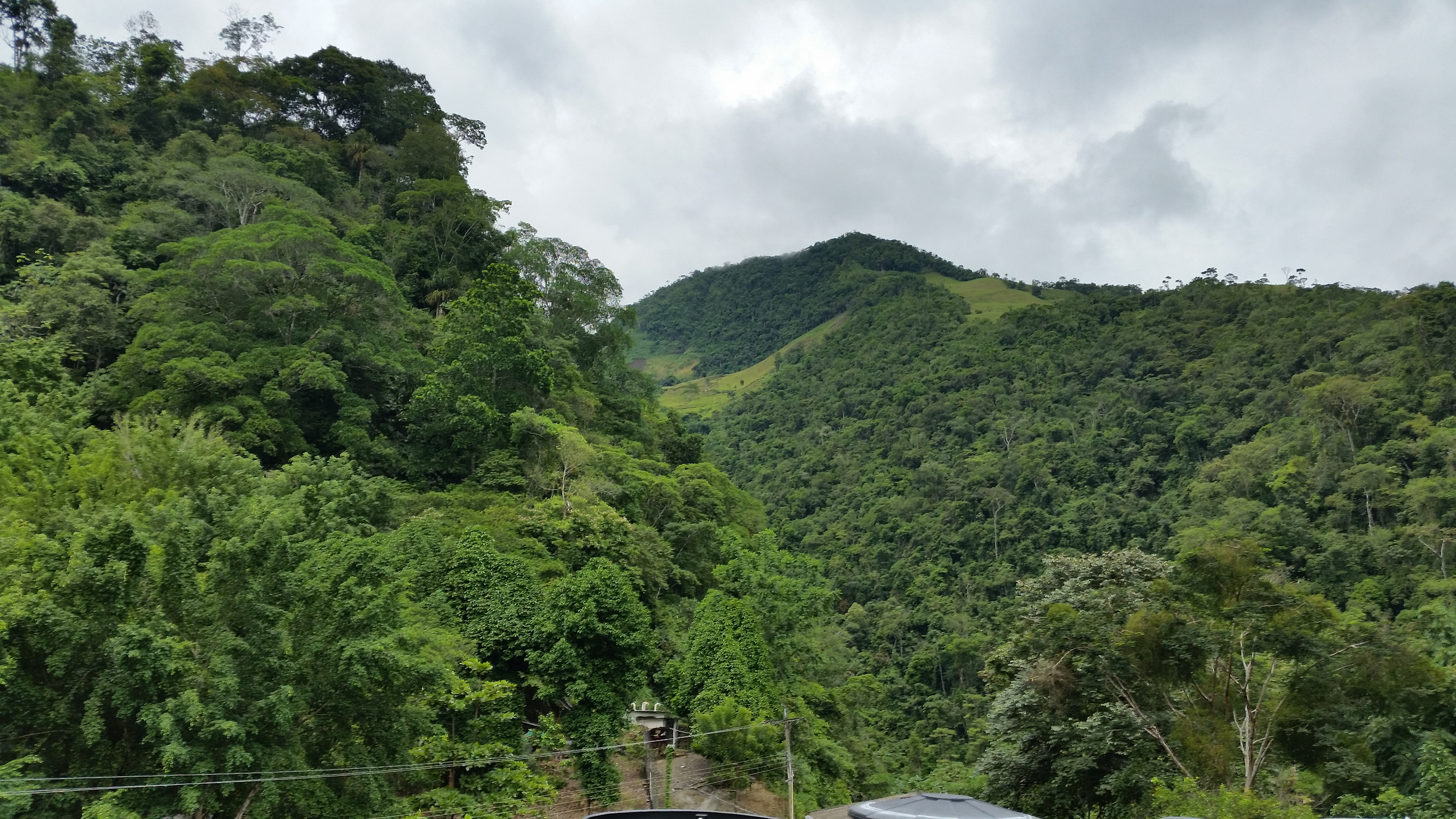
La Pita mountain view

La Pita is one of Colombia's largest emerald mines in Colombia, tantamount to its competitor, previously called Puerto Arturo, at present known as the Muzo Mine. La Pita has been one of the biggest contributors to Colombia's emerald production at times producing more than 80% of the total output of emeralds in Colombia. La Pita was discovered when an access road was being built, the workers and owners of the land descended towards Río Minero and noticed a yellowish patch of earth accompanied by the black carbonate altered shales of the Muzo Formation. This area is known as Amariallal and marked the establishment of La Pita Mine. The entrance of the mine was first opened in a ravine at the bottom of the mountain near Río Minero and extends approximately 500 metres (1,600 ft) until the tunnel makes contact with the principle fault line running through the length of the La Pita property.

La Pita is north of neighboring mine Cunas. Previously, a dispute between the two mines existed and both groups founded a mining agreement, that is defunct today. The agreement proposed that mining 35 metres (115 ft) north and south of the border between the mining districts was allowed by both parties. Today, the building structures and campsite are located on the property of Cunas.

Recently, La Pita had entered into an agreement with a publicly traded company, FURA Emeralds Inc. This has since been terminated.

Following that, a Canadian company entered into a non-binding agreement and was unable to successfully close on the contract. In 2016, a third company was entering into agreements for full operation at La Pita Mine and to acquire a stake in Zuliana De Esmeraldas Ltda.

== Geology ==
La Pita mine is mining emeralds from the Muzo Formation, operations are currently focused wholly in the footwall of the Río Minero Fault. The property lies on a productive portion of the fault, with ~1 km of the NNE, moderate to steeply dipping fault (~025/75(?)) running along the long-axis of the property. The Rio Minero fault is characterized by an ~80m wide, very irregular, but sharp contact breccia zone. This breccia is a carbonate altered, with minor content kaolinite altered clasts, localized fluorite matrix, polymicitic carbonate altered shale and carbonate vein clasts, laminated to massive euhedral to anhedral carbonate matrix, chaotic order, clast-supported to matrix-support, fine to very coarse unsorted sharp clast contacts, sub-angular to angular. At present the mine is focused only on the footwall of the fault, exploiting oblique fractures in the Muzo Formation shales of the western flank of the fault. There appears to be a periodicity to the occurrence of variable thickness (1 to 30 centimetres (0.39 to 11.81 in)) calcite veins (observed between 070/35 and 320/65 orientations), that are the primary target for emerald production. The intersections of vein sets are a fertile setting and may represent an upgrading feature. Where these secondary fractures intersect with the primary vein orientation, anecdotally it has been observed that there appears to be an improvement in both quality (colour and clarity) as well as, sometimes, quantity/size. These oblique vein sets (which may simply be conjugate fractures as a product of how the faulting influenced the host Muzo Formation (rheology during formation)) represent the primary source of emeralds in the current operations at La Pita. These vein sets are productive up to several meters away from the fault itself.

=== Muzo Formation ===
Muzo Formation (K1m - Hauterivian-Barremian age), outcropping in the sector of Las Pavas, Peñas Blancas, Coscuez, also appears in Vélez, Chiquinquirá and La Palma. It is part of the flanks of La Chapa-Borbur Anticlinal, also observed in the syncline of Otanche, in the sector of Coscuez. In the region of Muzo and Calcetero, the formation is also part of the syncline of El Almendro and forms the nucleus of the Pauna Anticlinal.

This unit houses most of the emerald-producing mines in the region such as Coscuez. The Muzo Formation is a generally calcareous sequence, while to the north of the Ibacapí Fault it is observed to be weathered and its calcareous composition is not recognized. To the north of Pauna the formation has a siliceous character. In general it is composed of dark gray calcareous claystones with lenses and limestone concretions. Additionally, it is common to find pyrite and calcite veins. These claystones are interspersed with sandy siltstones and quartz sandstones. Towards the middle of the segment arise shales and albitized limestone, somewhat calcareous. At this level appear a brecciated and mineralized zone with veins of calcite and sheets of oxidized sulphides. The upper part of the segment is interspersed with layers of gray claystones with layers of siltstones containing fauna depicted in ammonite molds. At the bottom of this unit is the La Marina Mine and to the south the emerald mines of La Pita, Consorcio, Totumos, Polveros and others. The first calcareous package becomes thicker towards the south, it has a thickness of 2 metres (6.6 ft), and in the sector of Totumos and Polveros reaches 45 metres (148 ft), and is composed of intercalations of limestone (micrite), loam and sandy siltstones. The zone of hydrothermal breccias that is immediately above the calcareous rocks, in the La Pita Mine has a thickness of approximately 30 metres (98 ft), and at the Totumos Mine can reach to 50 metres (160 ft). This unit in the area of Coscuez and Muzo presents emeralds; its characteristic remains limestone in layers of calcareous siltstones interspersed with calcareous claystones. To the south of the area, this unit presents similar characteristics. A stratigraphic column along the La Palma-Yacopí road, shows that this unit is composed of a black marl with a solid appearance with black calcareous claystone intercalations. In the upper part, intercalations of black shale with gypsum flakes and abundant pyritic micritical concretions appear, some with ammonites.

== Mining licence ==
The La Pita concession agreement is active and registered with the National Mining Agency of Colombia. The title holders of Las Pita have a 30-year exploration/exploitation license, this title granted the exclusive right to extract the corresponding minerals and to conduct the necessary efforts to explore, exploit, process, transport and ship the relevant minerals.

== Mine safety and security ==
Site security currently has several weak points, from the working face to processing of potential ore. The mine is not currently managed with consideration for who is in the mine when it is open and material is not properly processed before being dumped and accessed by the general public. Improvement in security would be relatively simple both from a capital expenditure and implementation perspective. There are 4 points of access, which can be controlled by guards, cameras and doors/walls. The ore would need to be handled differently than it currently is, as there is a substantial amount of material being moved out of the mine and into public area, with only the identified mineralization isolated, but emeralds being present in the other material after. Although effort is made to capture emeralds coming off the face, it has been demonstrated that there are emeralds winding up in the tailings with regularity, of variable quality. The two primary security issues are, access to the mine site when the workings are open and ore processing. Porto Gringo access to the north may represent the greatest weakness to securing the site right now, because of the agreement to allow access to the neighbouring operation.

The mining region, despite its poor reputation is actually safe and community orientated, the violence is now a faint memory of the past. Security in the mine is a collaboration between private security, National Police of Colombia and the National Armed Forces of Colombia. This presence provides for a very secure work place and community support, where the police and military often participate in community social projects ranging from building homes, aqueducts and road maintenance.
