= Muzo (disambiguation) =

Muzo is a municipality in Boyacá, Colombia.

Muzo may also refer to:

- Muzo people, the indigenous people of this area before the Spanish conquest
- Muzo language
- Muzo mine, Colombian emerald mine in the Muzo mining district
