= Crown of the Andes =

Gold highlighted in The MET collection

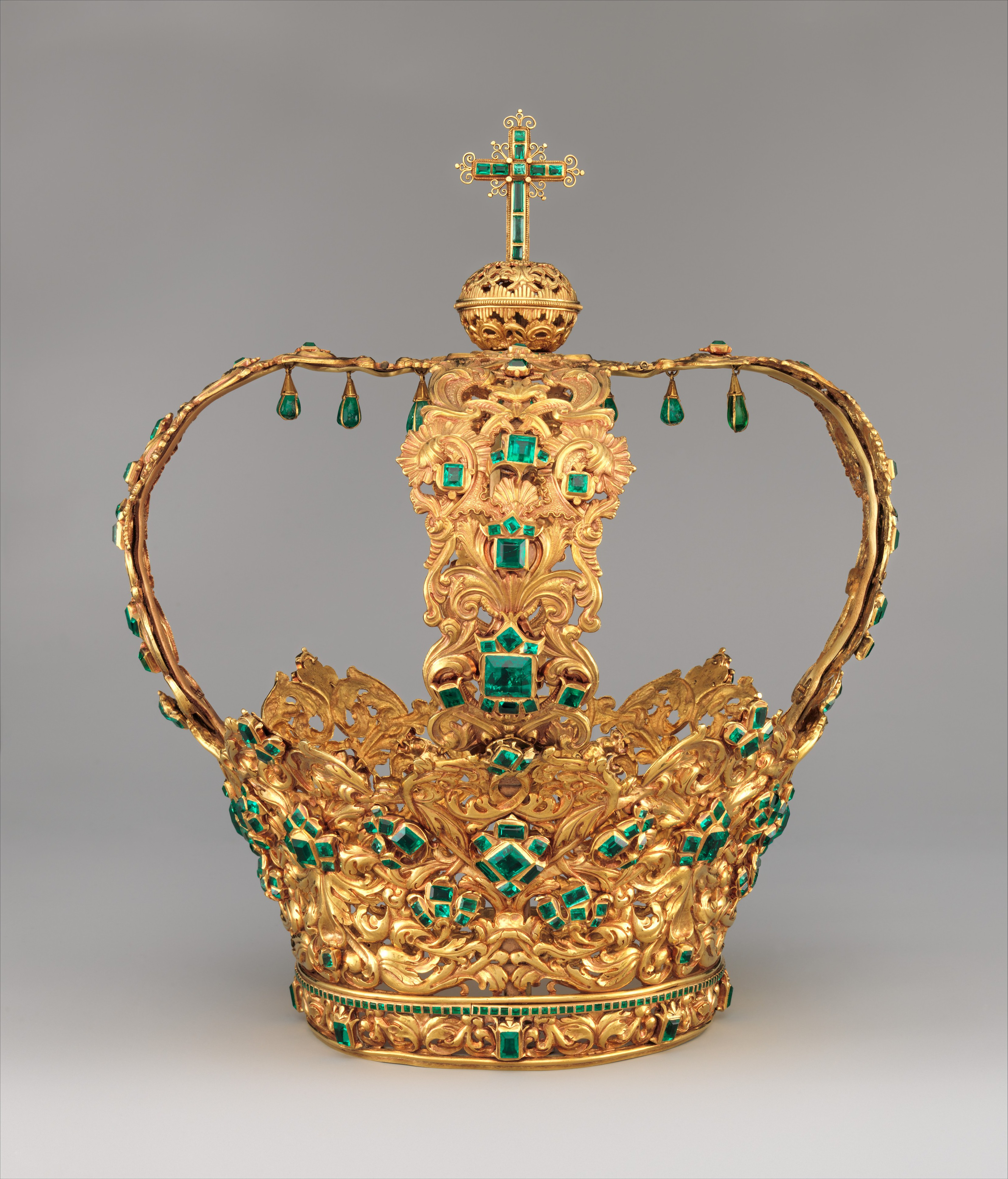
Crown of the Andes

The Crown of Our Lady of the Assumption of Popayán, known as the Crown of the Andes (in Spanish as La Corona de los Andes and as La Corona de Nuestra Señora de la Asunción de Popayán), is a votive crown originally made for a larger-than-life sized statue of the Virgin Mary in the cathedral of Popayán, Colombia. The oldest parts of the crown are the orb and cross at the top, which date to the 16th century. The diadem was made around 1660, and the arches were added around 1770. The crown is adorned with 450 emeralds, the largest of which is the "Atahualpa Emerald"; this might have belonged to Incan Emperor Atahualpa (1497–1533) and been seized from him when he was captured in 1532 by Francisco Pizarro, a Spanish conquistador.

In 1936, the crown was sold by Colombian owners to an American businessman. In 1963, it was sold at an auction at Sotheby's in London to the Dutch diamond company Asscher, acting for an anonymous buyer. As of December 2015, the crown belongs to the collection of the Metropolitan Museum of Art in New York City.

== Description ==
The crown is 34 centimetres (13 in) high with a body diameter of 33.4 centimetres (13.1 in), and weighs 2.17 kilograms (4.8 lb). It is made from 18 to 22 carat gold, repoussé and chased. There are 450 emeralds on it: the largest, known as the "Atahualpa Emerald", is a rectangular stone measuring 15.8 millimetres (0.62 in) by 16.14 millimetres (0.635 in).

== History ==
Various tales circulate about the construction and origin of the Crown of the Andes. According to the conventional account, it was made in the 1590s in gratitude for the city of Popayán after being spared an outbreak of smallpox which was devastating the region. It includes emeralds purportedly taken from Incan Emperor Atahualpa. However, Christopher Hartop, a jewellery expert who examined the crown during a proposed sale at Christie's in New York in 1995, suggested that it was a composite piece. He dated the little cross at the top to the 16th century, with the bottom half being completed in the 17th century and the intersecting arches dating to the 18th century.

The Crown had a long history of use in the Holy Week celebrations in Popayán, until the Confraternity of the Immaculate Conception (La Cofradía de la Inmaculada Concepción) sought papal permission to sell it in the early decades of the 20th century, dedicating the funds to charitable purposes. Permission was given in 1914, but the sellers did not find a buyer until 1936 when an American syndicate purchased it, led by Chicago businessman Warren J. Piper. Piper said that the crown would be broken up and the jewels sold individually, but this did not happen. Instead, it was exhibited sporadically over the next few decades, notably at Detroit in 1937 when General Motors used it at the unveiling of their new Chevrolet models. 225,000 people are said to have viewed it on that occasion, some 15% of the city's population. It was also displayed at the 1939 New York World's Fair and in 1959 at the Royal Ontario Museum.

The Crown was not sold during the 1995 Christie's sale. However, jeweler Oscar Heyman came into possession of the Crown, and subsequently gave it to his daughter, Alice Heyman, a women's activist and founding member of the Women's Bank of New York City. It was usually kept in New York, but was put on display in Indianapolis at an exhibition called Sacred Spain: Art and Belief in the Spanish World held from October 2009 to January 2010 at the Indianapolis Museum of Art. Its acquisition was announced by the Metropolitan Museum in New York in December 2015.

Although the crown was legally acquired and exported from Colombia, the Instituto Distrital de Cultura y Turismo of Colombia has argued that it is greatest importance comes from being made in Popayán from local gold and emeralds and continually used there in religious worship for three centuries, and therefore that it should be returned to the region where it has the most cultural significance.

== See also ==
- Colombian emeralds
- Muzo
