= Chiquinquirá =

- Municipality and town
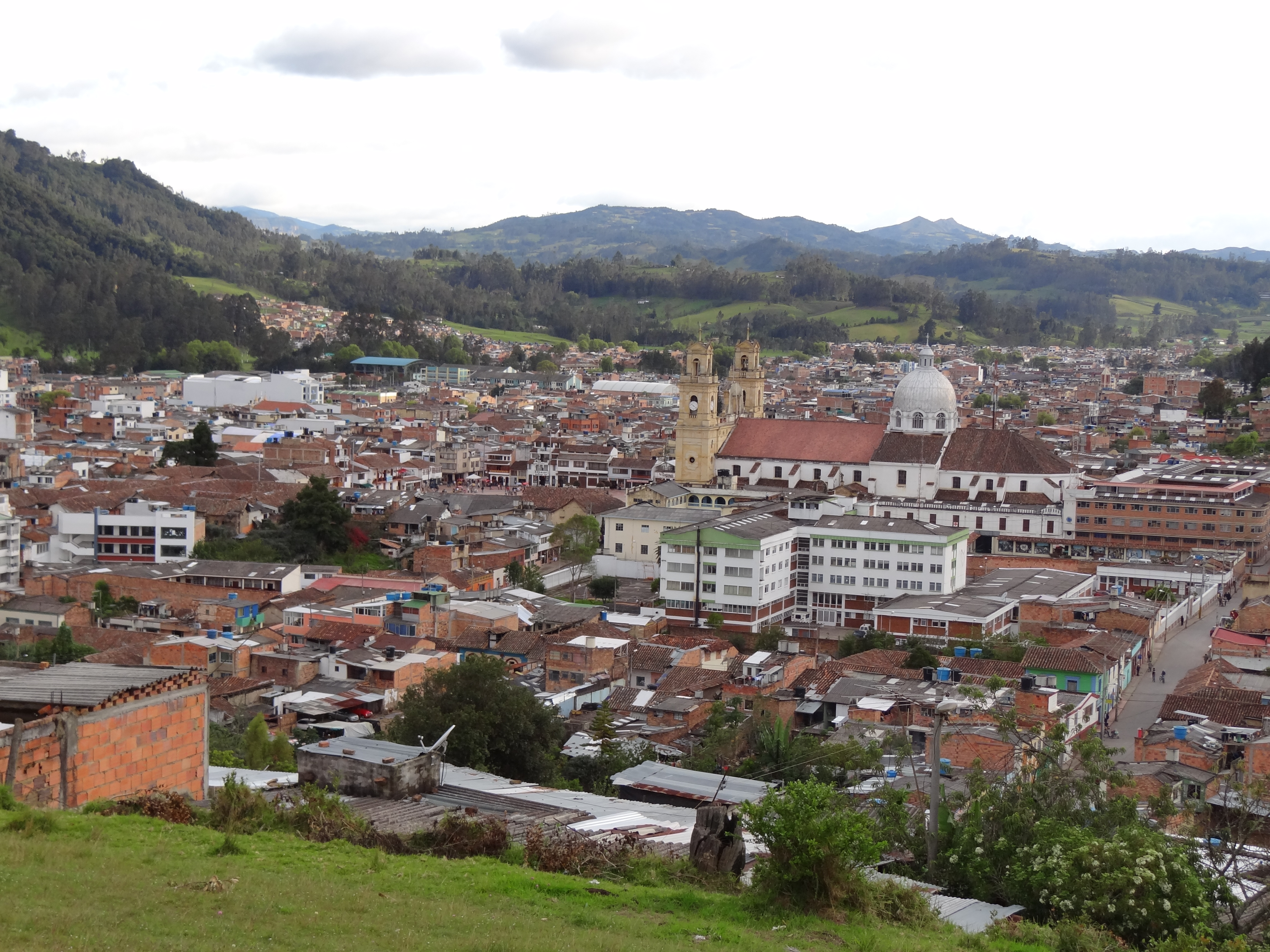
- View of Chiquinquirá

- Flag Coat of arms

- Location of the municipality and town of Chiquinquirá in the Boyacá Department of Colombia.

- Location in Colombia
- Coordinates: 5°37′08″N 73°49′12″W
- Country: Colombia
- Department: Boyacá Department
- Province: Western Boyacá Province
- Founded: never

Government
  - Mayor: Wilmar Ancizar Triana González (2020–2023)

Area
  - Municipality and town: 165 km^{2} (64 sq mi)
  - Urban: 6.38 km^{2} (2.46 sq mi)
- Elevation: 2,556 m (8,386 ft)

Population (2018 census)
  - Municipality and town: 56,054
  - Density: 340/km^{2} (880/sq mi)
  - Urban: 49,016
  - Urban density: 7,680/km^{2} (19,900/sq mi)
- Demonym: Chiquinquireño
- Time zone: UTC-5 (Colombia Standard Time)
- Postal code: 154640-49
- Area code: 57 + 8
- Website: Official website

Chiquinquirá is a town and municipality in the Colombian Department of Boyacá, part of the subregion of the Western Boyacá Province. Located some 115 km north of Bogotá, Chiquinquirá is situated 2,556 metres (8,386 ft) above sea level and has a yearly average temperature 58 °F (14 °C)

== Etymology ==
The name Chiquinquirá comes from Chibcha and means "Place of swamps covered with fog".

== Geography and religion ==
Chiquinquirá is constituted by two zones: the urban zone or town which is formed by approximately 40 neighborhoods between the strata 1 and 4, and the rural zone which is divided in 17 sub zones located around the city.

It is home to the Basilica of Our Lady of the Rosary of Chiquinquirá, which houses the image of the Virgen de Chiquinquirá, the patroness saint of Colombia. Chiquinquirá is a major point of religious pilgrimage.

== History ==
=== Conquest ===
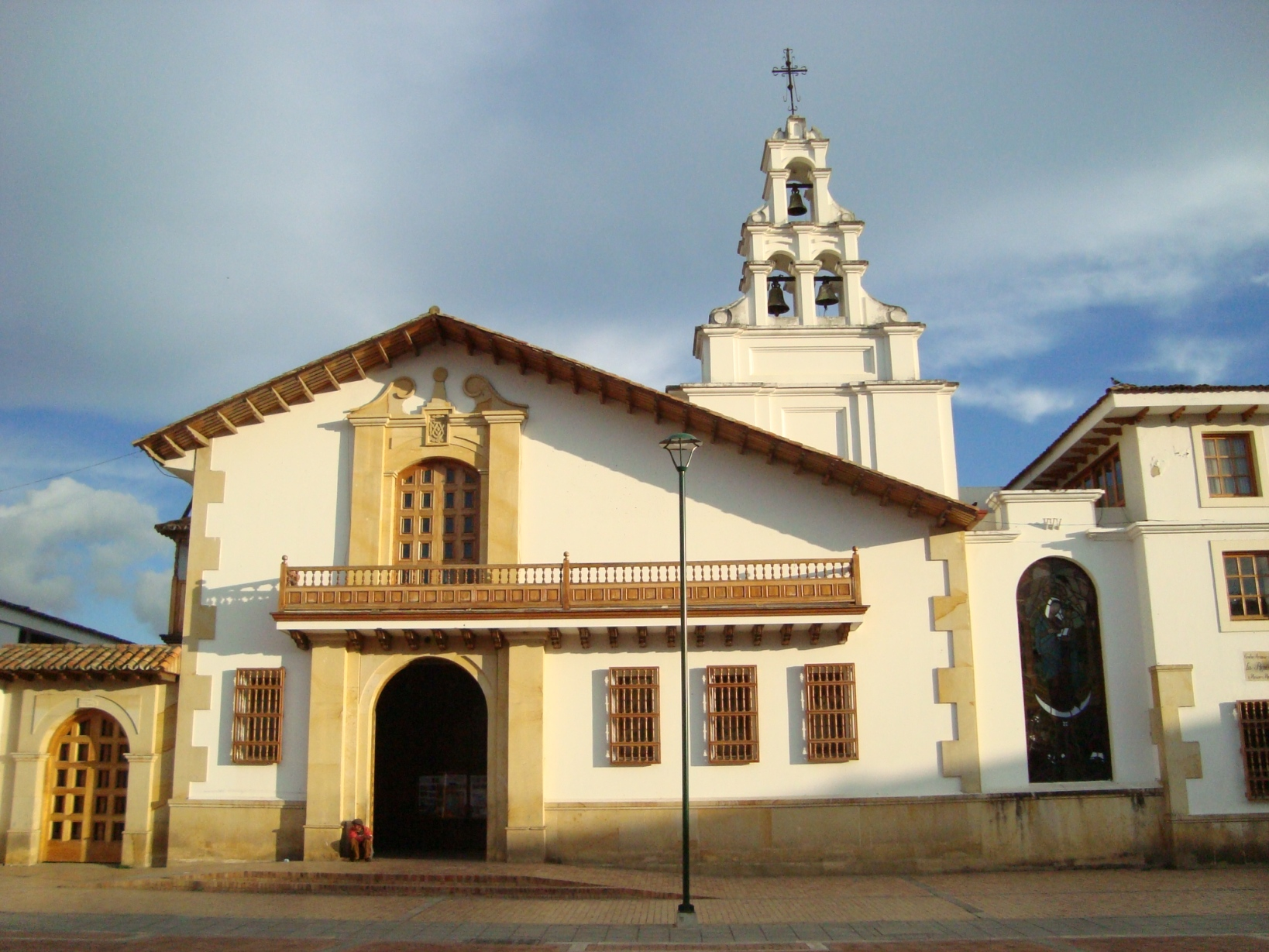
Church of the Renewal in Julio Flórez Park in the city of Chiquinquirá, the site where the renewal of the painting of the Virgin of Chiquinquirá is said to have occurred

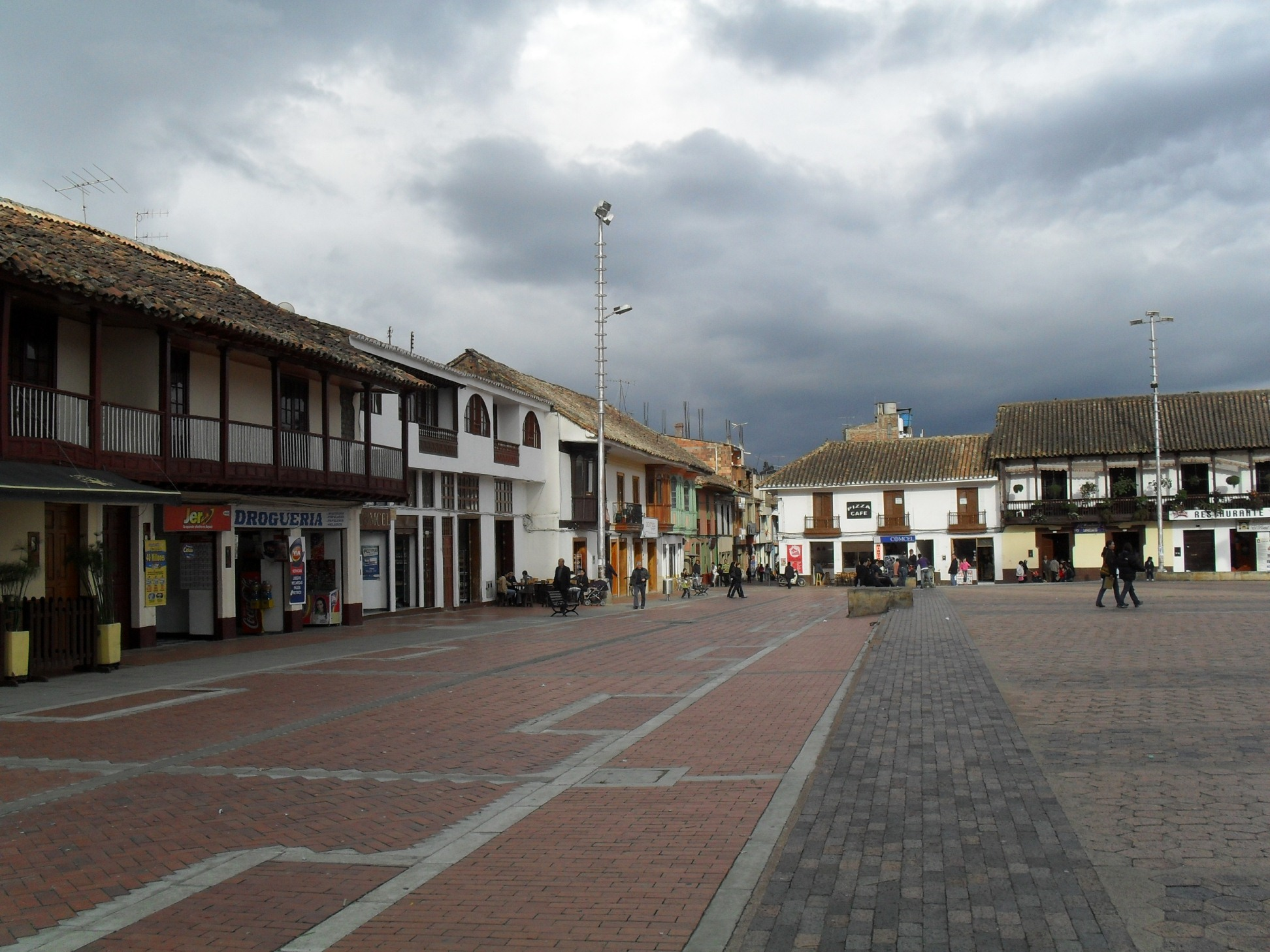
19th-century houses in Bolívar Square of the town

The first inhabitants were the Chiquinquiraes Indians, a group belonging to the Muisca people, who were governed by a cacique. Before the viceregal period, they were located along the Terebinto hill in the hamlet of Coca. They lived under constant threat from the Muzos, who attempted to invade their territory on several occasions, forcing them to confront these attacks with the help of the Saboyaes tribe.

=== Viceroyalty ===
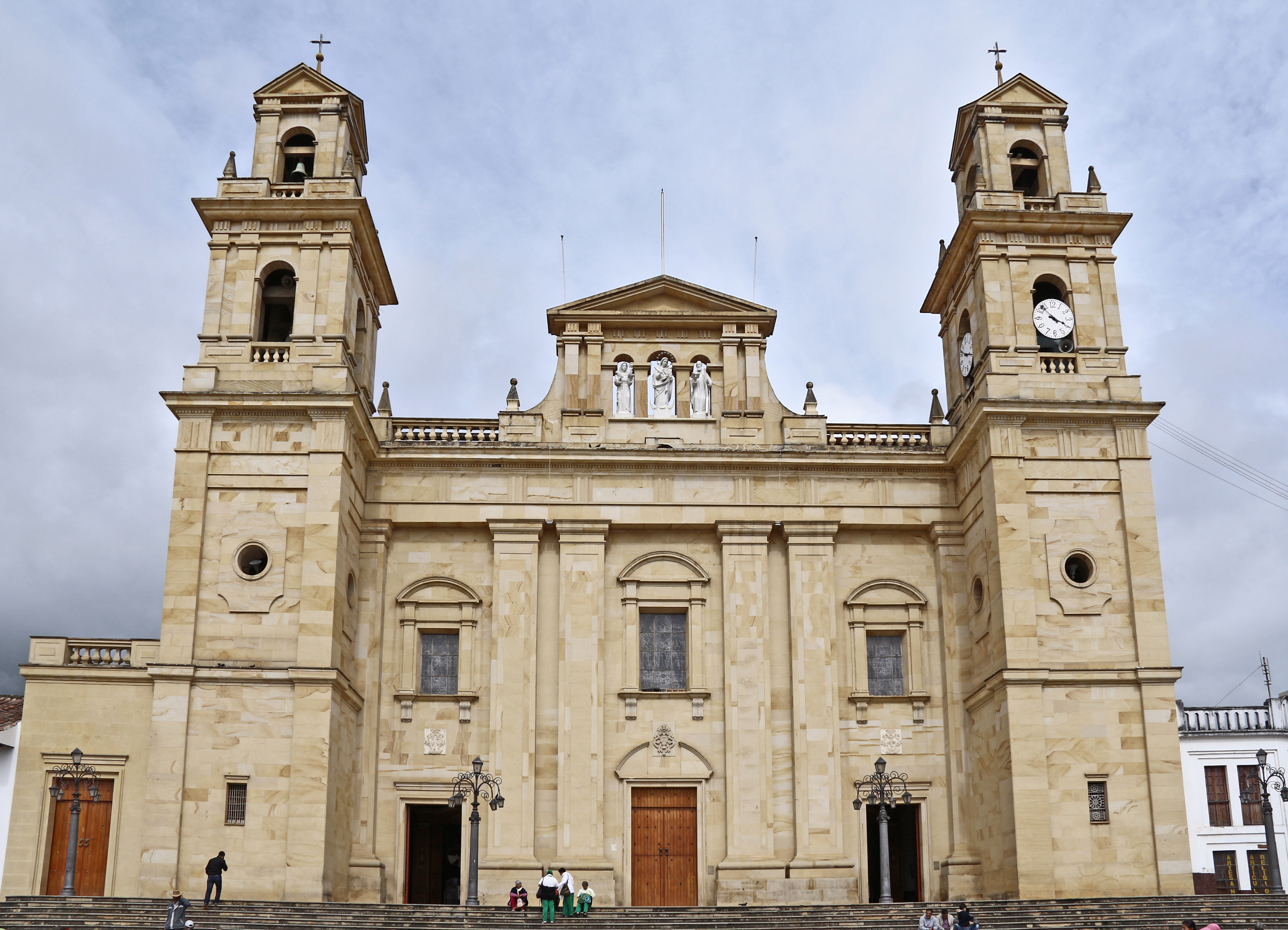
Basilica of Chiquinquirá

The settlement of Chiquinquirá arose from the constructions ordered by Catalina Díaz de Islos, widow of the encomendero Antonio de Santana, who built her residence on the left bank of the Chiquinquirá River. In 1586, the restoration of the painting of the Virgin of Chiquinquirá occurred, which, according to tradition, took place after the prayers of a woman of Spanish origin named María Ramos—an event known as “the Renewal” (la renovación).

From that year onward, around the chapel built at the site of the renewal of the painting of the Virgin of Chiquinquirá, the hamlet grew as merchants—mostly Spanish—and the wealthier inhabitants of the surrounding areas arrived.

It was erected as a parish in 1588, as a municipality in 1636, and finally as a city in 1651. In 1640, the Dominican friars began the construction of the first convent on land that is now Julio Flórez Park. From 1817, this building served as the headquarters of the Jesús María y José School, founded in 1813. Until 1794, there was only one square, the Square of the Church of the Virgin; years later, the Constitution Square, now Julio Flórez Park, was established. An earthquake in 1785 damaged the church where the image of the Virgin was housed. In 1801, construction began on the Basilica of Our Lady of the Rosary of Chiquinquirá, which took more than 20 years to complete, considering that its construction coincided with the Colombian War of Independence.

=== 19th-century ===
On September 1, 1810, Chiquinquirá proclaimed its independence by signing the Act of the Republican Town, through which it declared its autonomy and independence from the overseas colonial government—this date being taken as the official date of foundation. After the victory in the Battle of Boyacá, on various occasions the Liberator Simón Bolívar visited the image of the Virgin of Chiquinquirá. However, the reasons for these visits were not necessarily religious in nature, as noted by his aide-de-camp Luis Perú de Lacroix in the Diario de Bucaramanga.

Throughout the 19th century, Chiquinquirá attempted on several occasions to assert its independence. In 1871, the physician Policarpo María Flórez (father of the poet Julio Flórez) rose up in arms against the government and served as president of the Sovereign State of Boyacá for four months.

=== 20th-century ===
In November 1967, a mass poisoning caused by the consumption of bread that had been made with flour that had been accidentally contaminated with parathion—a highly toxic organophosphate insecticide—resulted in 800 people being poisoned and 78 deaths (74 minors and 4 adults). As a result of this incident, the need to train Colombian physicians in toxicology was recognized for the first time, leading to the conclusion that strict legislation on the handling of potentially toxic substances was necessary. Murder charges would later be filed against a Bogotá truck driver who had delivered the flour and the owner of the bakery that had baked and sold the bread to local residents.

On July 3, 1986, Pope John Paul II, during his visit to Colombia, arrived in the city by air at the facilities of the Sucre Infantry Battalion. He then proceeded in the popemobile to Bolívar Square and visited the sanctuary of the Virgin, where he was received by the then president, Belisario Betancur, his cabinet, and the clergy. He subsequently celebrated a Eucharistic Mass at the site now known as John Paul II Park, before approximately 200,000 Catholics.

From 1987 to 2000, the municipality of Chiquinquirá received displaced populations, mainly from other municipalities in western Boyacá, partly due to violence related to disputes over the emerald trade and, to a lesser extent, from other parts of the country as a result of widespread violence in Colombia.

In an unprecedented criminal incident in Colombia, on May 15, 2000, the episode known as the “bomb collar” occurred, in which Elvia Cortés lost her life, a police subintendent was killed, and four other people were injured.

== Climate ==
Climate data for Chiquinquirá (Esclusa Tolon), elevation 2,545 m (8,350 ft), (1971–2000)
Month	Jan	Feb	Mar	Apr	May	Jun	Jul	Aug	Sep	Oct	Nov	Dec	Year
Mean daily maximum °C (°F)	19.5 (67.1)	19.6 (67.3)	19.6 (67.3)	19.5 (67.1)	19.2 (66.6)	18.6 (65.5)	18.3 (64.9)	18.5 (65.3)	18.8 (65.8)	19.0 (66.2)	19.3 (66.7)	19.3 (66.7)	19.1 (66.4)
Daily mean °C (°F)	12.1 (53.8)	13.1 (55.6)	13.5 (56.3)	13.8 (56.8)	13.8 (56.8)	13.2 (55.8)	12.7 (54.9)	12.7 (54.9)	13.0 (55.4)	13.4 (56.1)	13.6 (56.5)	13.2 (55.8)	13.2 (55.8)
Mean daily minimum °C (°F)	6.5 (43.7)	7.3 (45.1)	8.1 (46.6)	9.3 (48.7)	9.3 (48.7)	8.1 (46.6)	7.2 (45.0)	7.1 (44.8)	7.5 (45.5)	8.9 (48.0)	9.1 (48.4)	7.6 (45.7)	8.0 (46.4)
Average precipitation mm (inches)	36.6 (1.44)	49.0 (1.93)	84.6 (3.33)	114.8 (4.52)	94.6 (3.72)	65.6 (2.58)	57.6 (2.27)	59.0 (2.32)	82.7 (3.26)	137.0 (5.39)	118.6 (4.67)	58.7 (2.31)	958.8 (37.75)
Average precipitation days	9	11	15	18	17	14	13	13	15	20	18	14	178
Average relative humidity (%)	75	76	77	78	77	75	73	73	74	78	79	77	76
Mean monthly sunshine hours	201.5	163.9	173.6	138.0	139.5	135.0	170.5	161.2	150.0	145.7	144.0	186.0	1,908.9
Mean daily sunshine hours	6.5	5.8	5.6	4.6	4.5	4.5	5.5	5.2	5.0	4.7	4.8	6.0	5.2
Source: Instituto de Hidrologia Meteorologia y Estudios Ambientales

== Geology ==
The Chiquinquirá Sandstone is named after the town.

== Demography ==
The 2018 census for Chiquinquirá reported an adjusted population of 56,504 inhabitants for the municipality, of whom 49,016 lived in the urban area and 7,038 in the rural area. The gender distribution showed 26,740 men and 29,314 women. By 2015, the projected population was 65,274 inhabitants.

In 2007, 1,727 births were reported in the municipality, of which 875 were male and 852 female. In 2008, there were 1,680 births—879 male and 801 female—47 fewer than in 2007. The birth rate for 2008 was 29.5 births per 1,000 inhabitants, significantly higher than the national rate for the same period, which was 15.86 births per 1,000 inhabitants. Some studies indicate that this high rate is largely influenced by the fact that Chiquinquirá has the only second-level referral hospital serving 18 municipalities, suggesting that these high rates reflect births to pregnant women referred from other municipalities to this center for medical services during childbirth.

In 2007, 253 deaths were reported (132 men and 121 women), while in 2008 there were 277 deaths (138 men and 139 women). The mortality rate in 2008 was 4.86 deaths per 1,000 inhabitants, also higher than the national rate, which recorded 4.07 deaths per 1,000 inhabitants.

According to census-based sources, the overwhelming majority of residents were classified as “other ethnicities” (effectively mestizo/white), with very small proportions identifying as Black/Afro-Colombian (~0.06%) or Indigenous (~0.02%)

== Economy ==
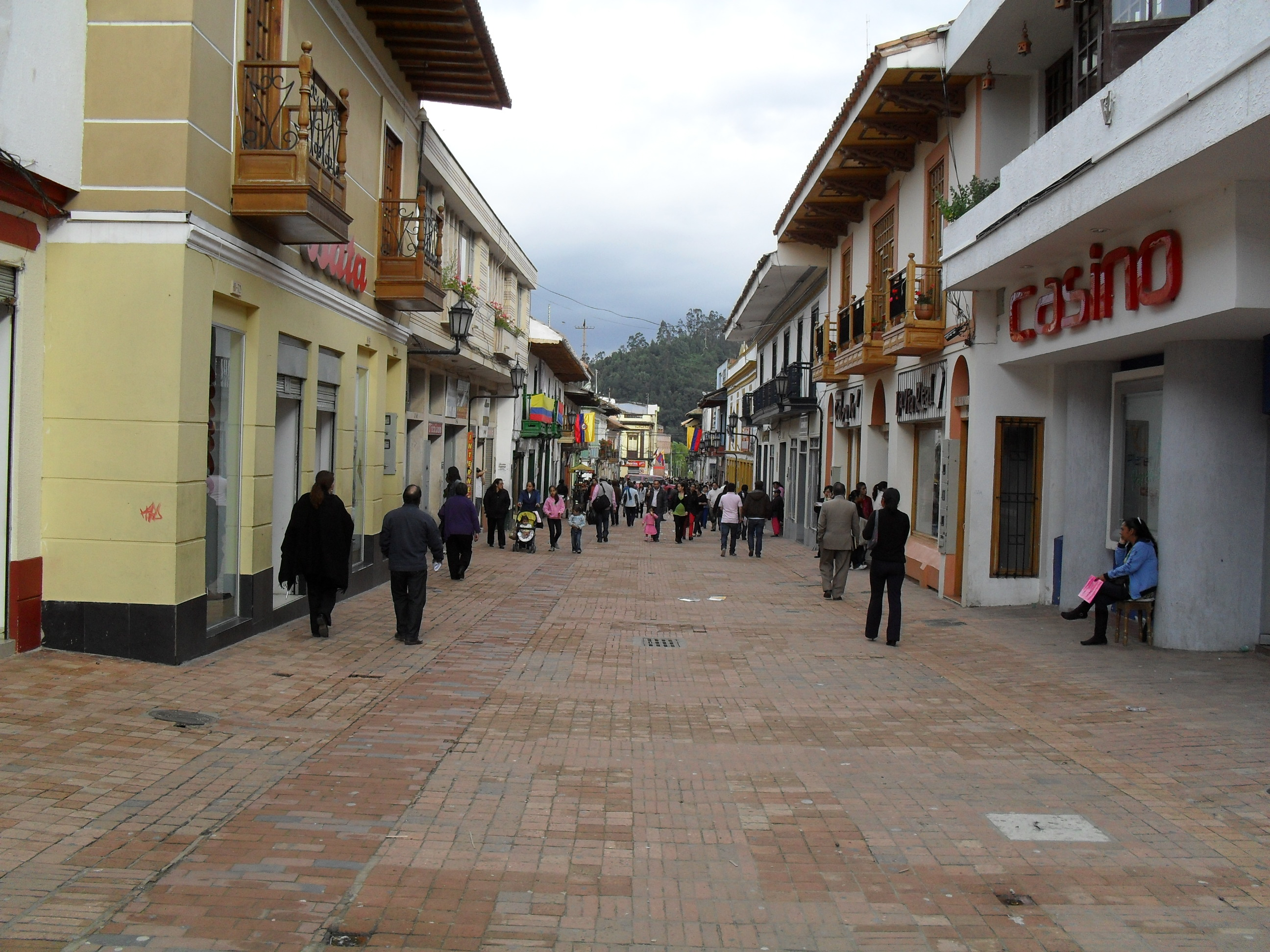
Commercial establishments along the pedestrian street of Chiquinquirá

The most important activity in the city is commerce. Due to its strategic location and its status as the most populous city in the Western Province of Boyacá, it serves as a regional center for the collection and distribution of agricultural products. The local agricultural sector is also significant, with the production of milk and dairy products, corn, potatoes, wheat, and vegetables. In addition, there is an extractive mining sector, which shares asphalt deposits with the municipalities of Muzo and Saboyá; there is also abundant clay and numerous quarries for construction materials.

Commercial activity is represented by approximately 2,000 establishments engaged in the sale of food products, clothing, textiles, general merchandise, household goods, construction materials and products, warehouses, storage facilities, pharmacies, and stationery, among others. The largest of these establishments include the local branch of Almacenes YEP, which mainly sells groceries, household goods, clothing, stationery, cosmetics, hardware, and electrical products, and Colsubsidio, inaugurated in mid-2011, which sells appliances, household products, hardware, food, clothing, toys, ice cream, meat, and more.

According to the results of the 2005 census, 5.4% of establishments in the urban area are engaged in industry, 63.5% in commerce, 30.8% in services, and 0.3% in other activities. Of all establishments, 97.7% employed between 1 and 10 people in the month prior to the census. Among establishments with the highest number (0 to 10 employees), commerce (65.8%) is the most frequent activity, while in the group employing 10 to 50 people, services are the main activity (74.2%). Additionally, 7.5% of households in Chiquinquirá carry out economic activities within their homes.

In rural areas, 89.0% of homes engage in agricultural activities. Of the total crops associated with rural housing, 58.7% are single temporary crops, 10.8% are associated temporary crops, 24.5% are single permanent crops, and 5.9% are associated permanent crops.

Regarding manufacturing industry, there are currently around 350 microenterprises, the most prominent being those related to food production and transport services. The tourism sector is another important source of income due to the number of visitors who daily visit the basilica and other attractions in the city. Handicrafts are also produced in the municipality; the most notable include items made of vegetable ivory (tagua), clay, and fique, as well as guitars, requintos, and tiples, images, and souvenirs of the Virgin of Chiquinquirá and the basilica. There is still a small, emerging market for emeralds originating from municipalities in the western part of the department, although this activity has gradually been disappearing from the city.

Since 2009, a project for the construction of a free trade zone has been underway near the urban area of the municipality, covering an area of 21 hectares and with an estimated cost of 24.3 billion pesos. By mid-2010, the process had received approval from the Intersectoral Commission on Free Trade Zones, pending only the official declaration by the DIAN.

== Infrastructure ==
=== Security ===
In the municipality of Chiquinquirá is located Infantry Battalion No. 02 Marshal “Antonio José de Sucre”, a unit of the National Army of Colombia, founded in 1883. Initially, the battalion was part of the Military Command of Barranquilla, the Atlantic Coast, and the Lower Magdalena, and was later transferred to Bogotá. Between 1890 and 1975 it was stationed in various locations across Colombia, including Chiquinquirá from 1937 to 1942. Since 1975, it has permanently remained in this city's garrison, providing security to the Western Province of Boyacá. The facilities of the battalion also house the headquarters of Military District No. 6 for recruitment of the Colombian Army.

The city hosts the Second Police District of Chiquinquirá, according to Resolution 1026 of 2006 of the Ministry of Defense of Colombia and the National Police of Colombia for the department of Boyacá. This district oversees police stations in the municipalities of Chiquinquirá, Caldas, Coper, Muzo, La Victoria, Otanche, Saboyá, Briceño, Buenavista, Maripí, Pauna, Quípama, San Miguel de Sema, San Pablo de Borbur (to which the Santa Bárbara substation belongs), and Tununguá.

== Gallery ==
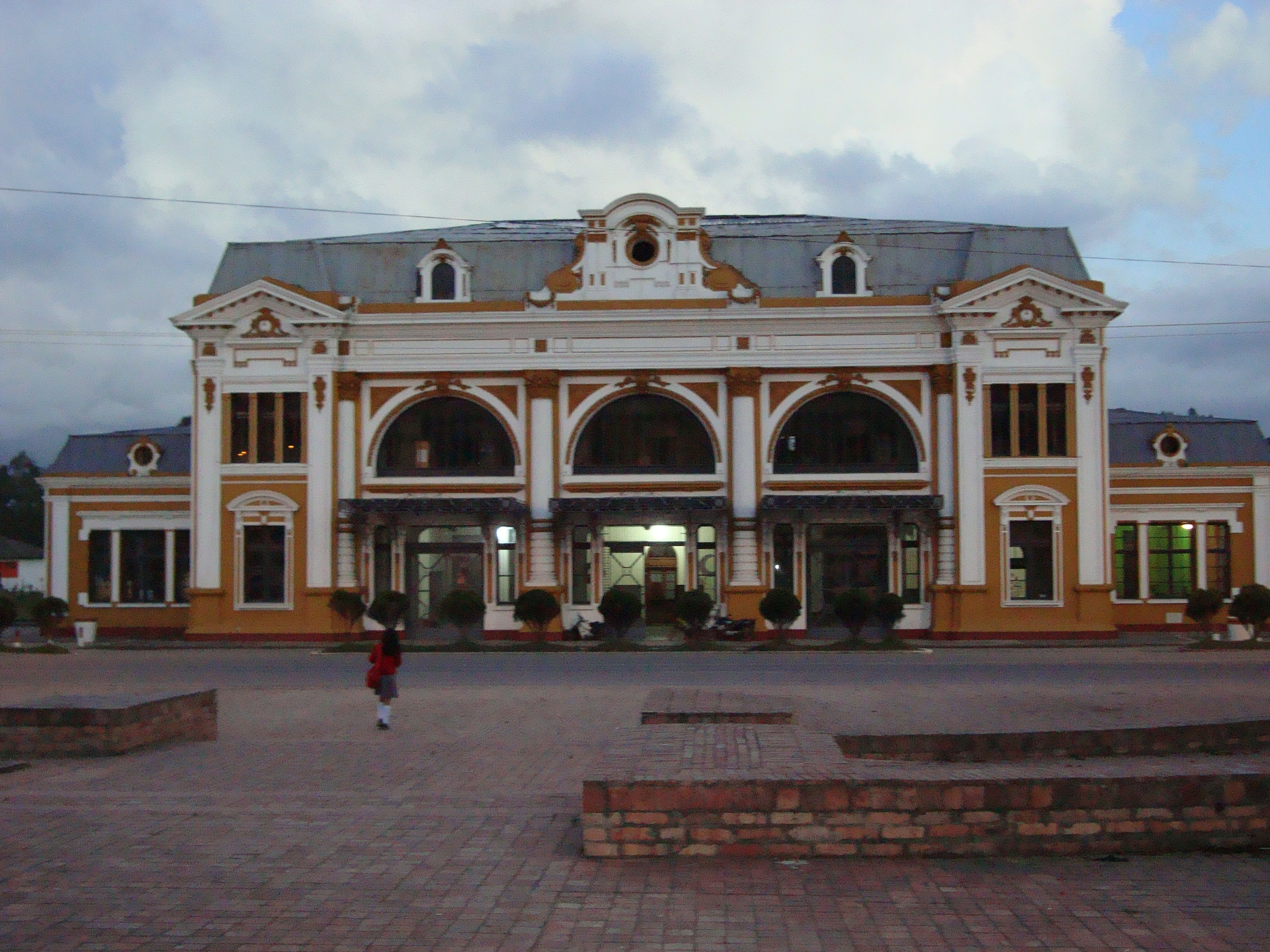
Cultural centre

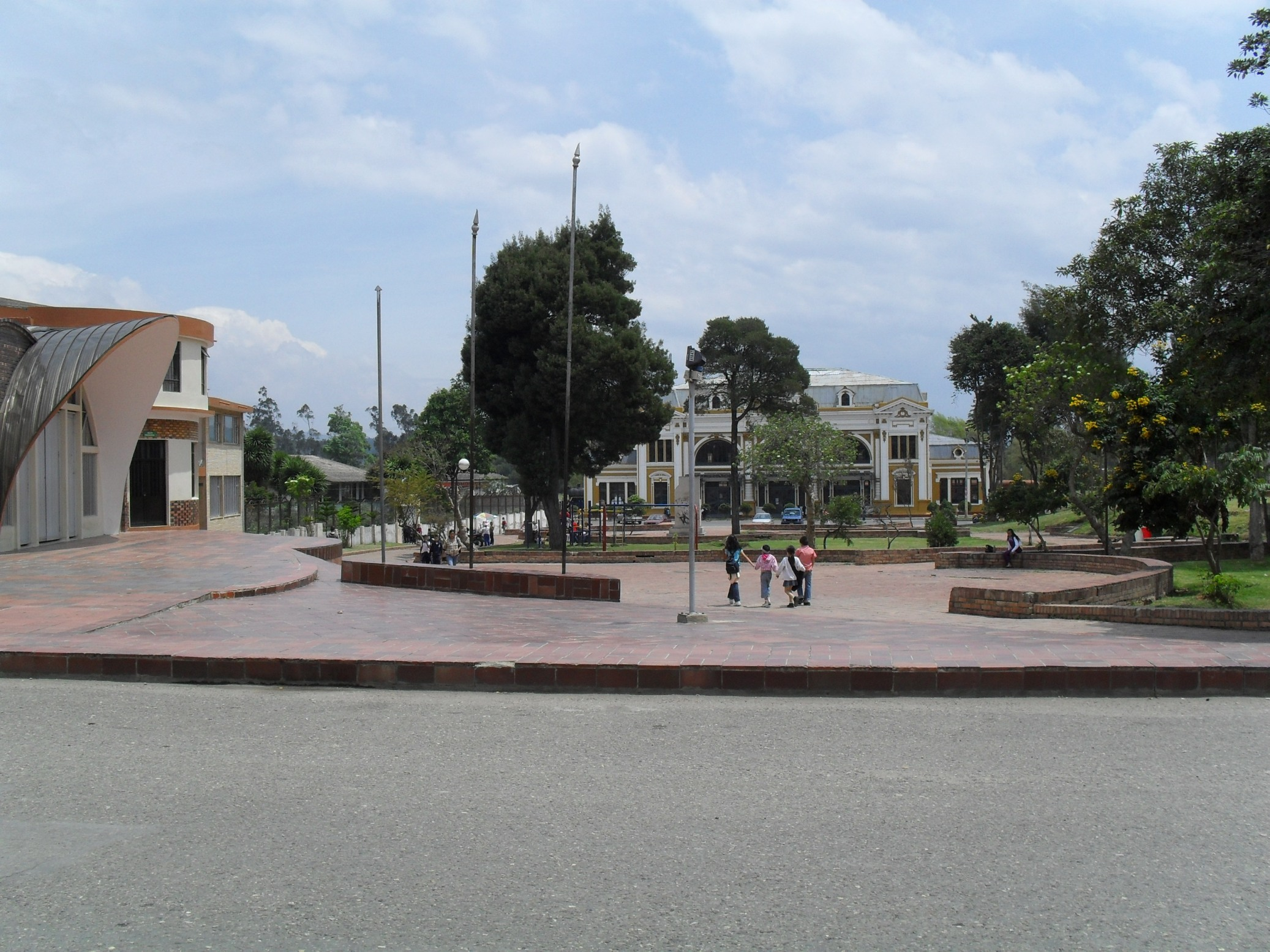
David Guarín Park

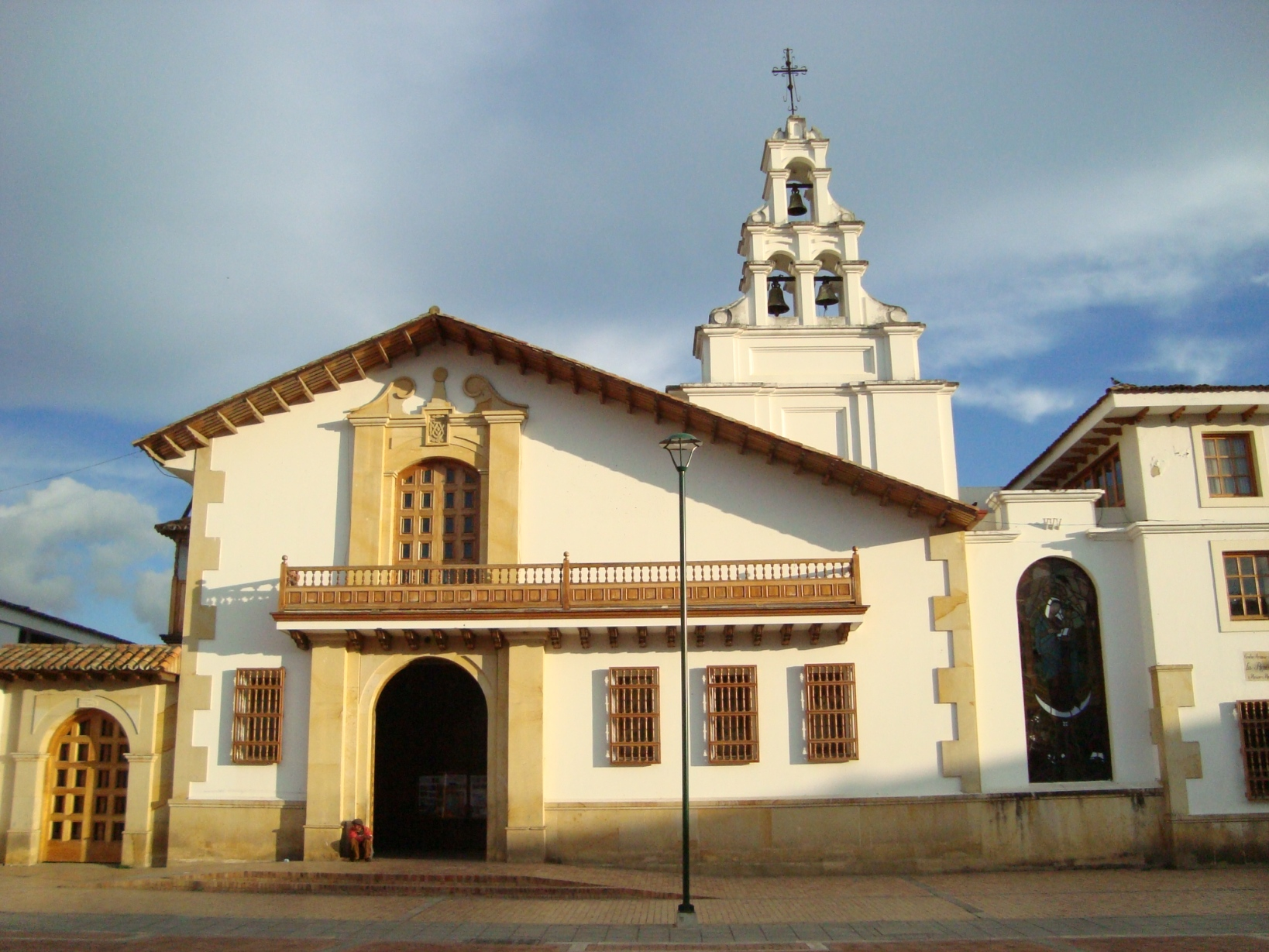
Church

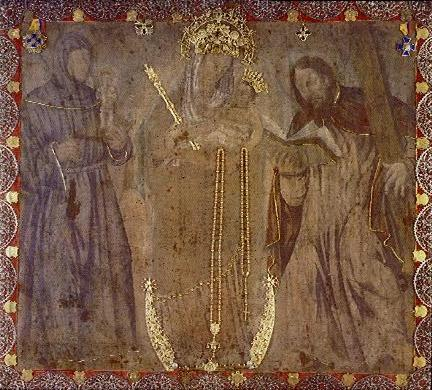
Painting of the Virgin Mary
