= Duke of Devonshire Emerald =

Large uncut emerald from the Muzo mine in Boyacá, Colombia

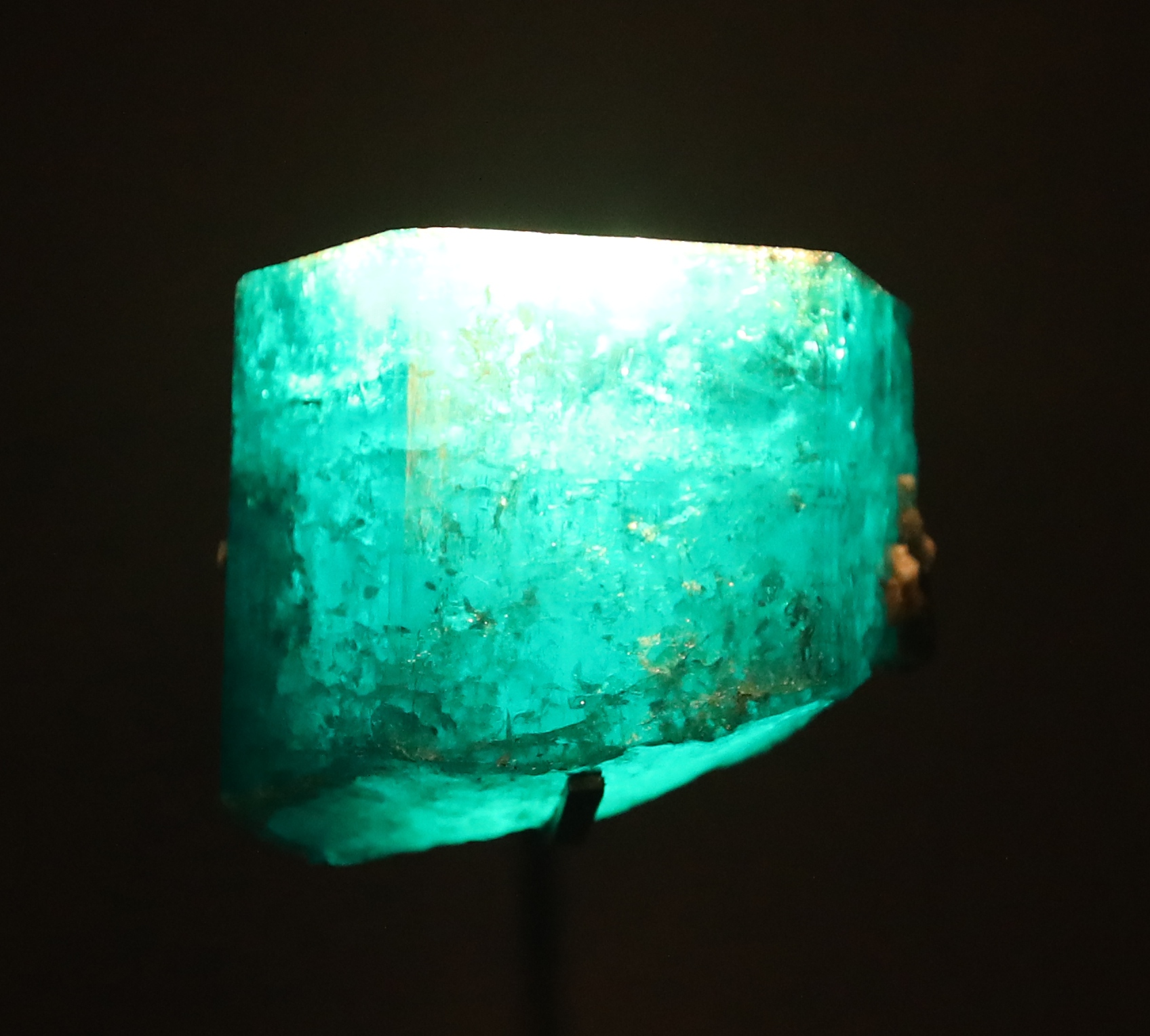
- Type of stone: Emerald
- Weight: 1,383.93 carats (276.786 g)
- Color: Emerald green
- Cut: uncut
- Country of origin: Colombia
- Mine of origin: Muzo, Boyacá
- Discovered: unknown
- Original owner: William Cavendish, 6th Duke of Devonshire
- Owner: Peregrine Cavendish, 12th Duke of Devonshire; Natural History Museum, London (on loan)

The Duke of Devonshire Emerald is one of the world's largest and most famous uncut emeralds, weighing 1,383.93 carats (276.786 g). Originating in the mine at Muzo, Colombia, it was either gifted or sold by Emperor Pedro I of Brazil to William Cavendish, 6th Duke of Devonshire, in 1831. It was displayed at the Great Exhibition in London in 1851, and more recently at the Natural History Museum since 2007. There were initial rumors the stone housed in the museum was a replica, however the stone currently on display is indeed the real one. It is currently on a long-term loan from the Duke of Devonshire.

== See also ==
- Colombian emeralds
- Muzo
- List of individual gemstones
- List of emeralds by size
