= Florián =

Coordinates: 5.80472°N 73.9742°W

- Municipality and town
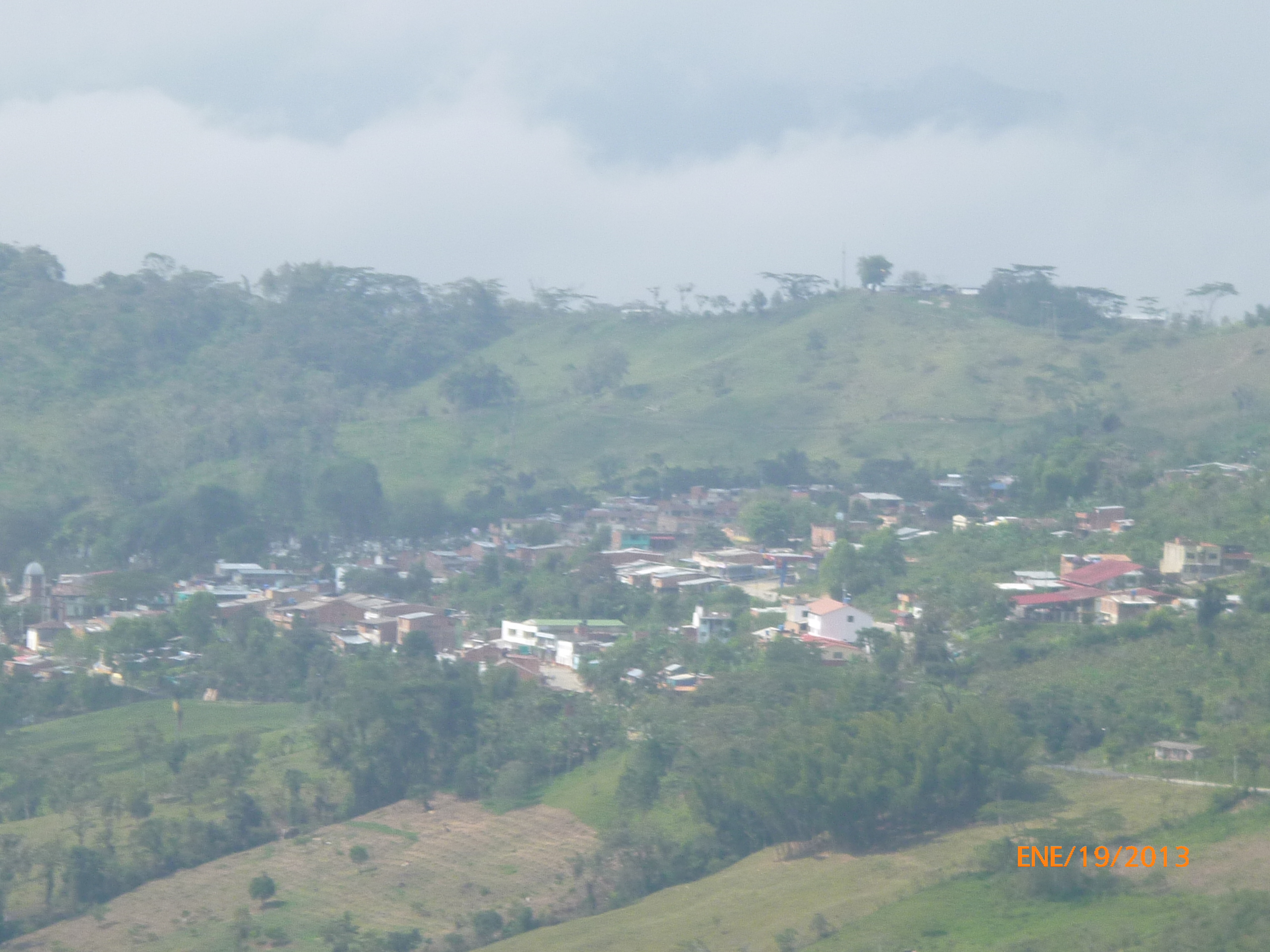
- View of Florián

- Flag

- Location of the municipality and town of Florián in the Santander Department of Colombia.
- Country: Colombia
- Department: Santander Department
- Time zone: UTC-5 (Colombia Standard Time)

El Florián is a town and municipality in the Santander Department in northeastern Colombia founded by the Pardo family.
