= Maripí =

- Municipality and town
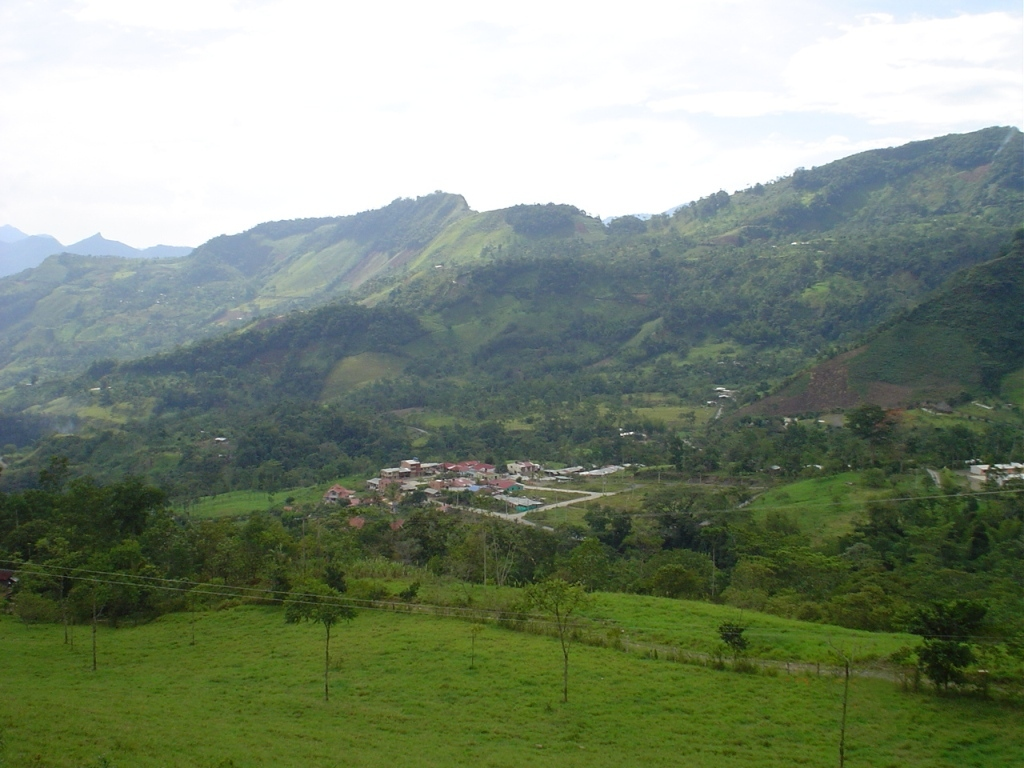

- Flag

- Location of the municipality and town of Maripí in Boyacá
- Coordinates: 5°33′N 74°01′W
- Country: Colombia
- Department: Boyacá
- Province: Western Boyacá Province

Government
  - Mayor: Imer Yaridma Murcia Monroy (2020-2023)
- Time zone: UTC-5 (Colombia Standard Time)

Maripí is a town and municipality in the Colombian Department of Boyacá, part of the subregion of the Western Boyacá Province. The town hosts an important emerald mine; La Pita.

== See also ==
- La Pita
- Muzo, Chivor, Somondoco
