= Otanche =

Coordinates: 5°45′N 74°15′W

- Municipality and town
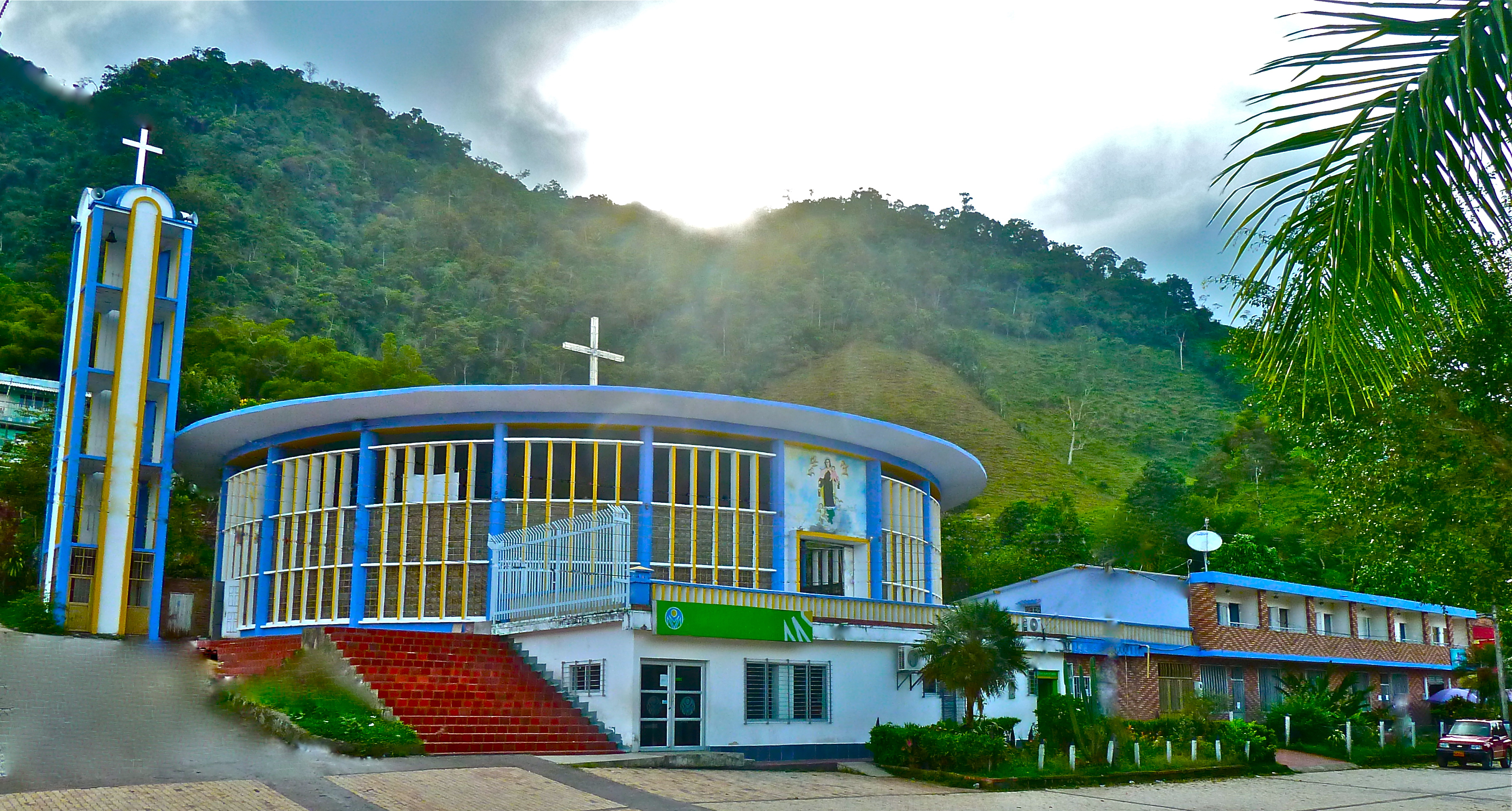

- Flag

- Location of the municipality and town of Otanche in the Boyacá Department of Colombia.
- Country: Colombia
- Department: Boyacá Department
- Province: Western Boyacá Province

Government
  - Mayor: Evelio Puentes Rocha (2020-2023)

Population (Census 2018)
  - Total: 6,997
- Time zone: UTC-5 (Colombia Standard Time)

Otanche is a town and municipality in Boyacá Department, Colombia, part of the subregion of the Western Boyacá Province.

== Climate ==
Otanche has a tropical rainforest climate (Köppen: Aw) with mild temperatures and high amounts of rainfall throughout the year.

Climate data for Otanche, elevation 1,070 m (3,510 ft), (1981–2010)
Month	Jan	Feb	Mar	Apr	May	Jun	Jul	Aug	Sep	Oct	Nov	Dec	Year
Mean daily maximum °C (°F)	26.1 (79.0)	26.4 (79.5)	26.3 (79.3)	26.5 (79.7)	26.8 (80.2)	26.9 (80.4)	27.0 (80.6)	27.3 (81.1)	26.9 (80.4)	26.4 (79.5)	26.0 (78.8)	26.0 (78.8)	26.5 (79.7)
Daily mean °C (°F)	22.2 (72.0)	22.3 (72.1)	22.5 (72.5)	22.6 (72.7)	22.8 (73.0)	22.9 (73.2)	22.7 (72.9)	22.9 (73.2)	22.7 (72.9)	22.3 (72.1)	22.2 (72.0)	22.2 (72.0)	22.5 (72.5)
Mean daily minimum °C (°F)	18.7 (65.7)	18.8 (65.8)	18.8 (65.8)	18.7 (65.7)	18.8 (65.8)	18.7 (65.7)	18.5 (65.3)	18.8 (65.8)	18.4 (65.1)	18.5 (65.3)	18.5 (65.3)	18.7 (65.7)	18.6 (65.5)
Average precipitation mm (inches)	192.8 (7.59)	214.6 (8.45)	258.7 (10.19)	398.6 (15.69)	382.0 (15.04)	209.0 (8.23)	177.3 (6.98)	203.1 (8.00)	280.0 (11.02)	485.8 (19.13)	364.5 (14.35)	240.7 (9.48)	3,401.2 (133.91)
Average precipitation days (≥ 1.0 mm)	16	16	20	23	24	19	18	17	20	24	23	19	236
Average relative humidity (%)	89	89	89	89	89	88	87	87	88	89	89	90	88
Source: Instituto de Hidrologia Meteorologia y Estudios Ambientales
