= Paja Formation =

Early Cretaceous geologic formation of central Colombia

- Stratigraphic range: Late Hauterivian-Late Aptian; ~130–113 Ma
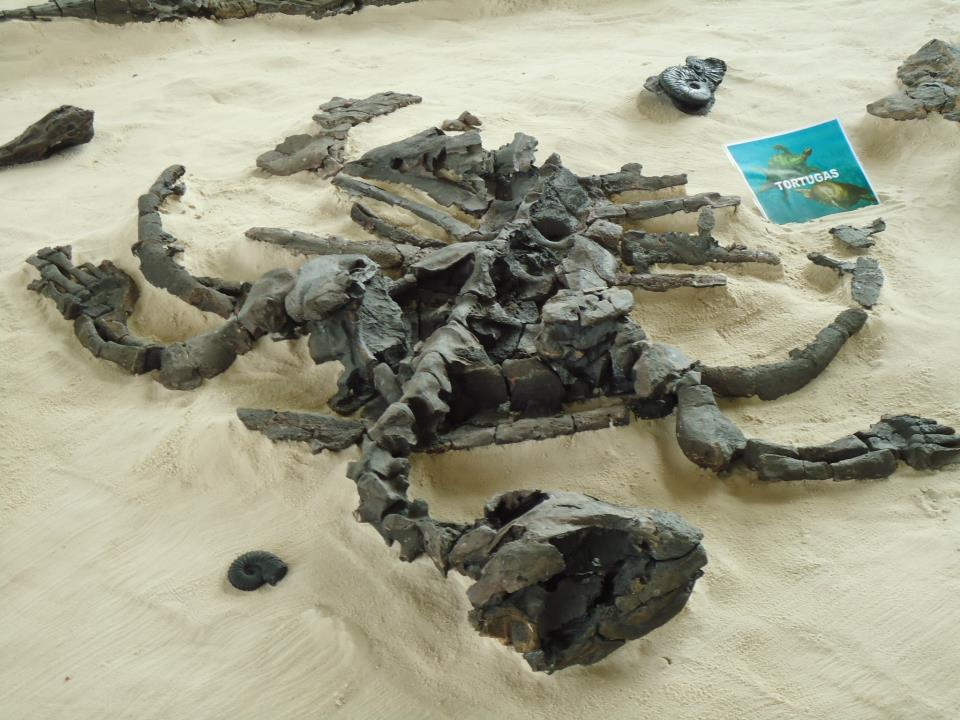
- Desmatochelys padillai from the Paja Formation
- Type: Geological formation
- Sub-units: Lutitas Negras Inferiores, Arcillolitas Abigarradas & Arcillolitas con Nódulos Huecos Members
- Underlies: San Gil Group, Simití & Tablazo Formations
- Overlies: Ritoque & Rosablanca Formations
- Area: 450 km (280 mi)
- Thickness: up to 940 m (3,080 ft)

Lithology
- Primary: Black shale, claystone, sandstone and limestone concretions
- Other: Gypsum, chalcopyrite, galena, malachite, pyrite, sphalerite

Location
- Coordinates: 5.5°N 73.5°W
- Approximate paleocoordinates: 3.7°N 42.2°W
- Region: Bolívar, Boyacá, Cundinamarca & Santander
- Country: Colombia
- Extent: Altiplano Cundiboyacense; Eastern Ranges, Andes; Middle Magdalena Valley

Type section
- Named for: Quebrada La Paja
- Named by: Wheeler
- Year defined: 1929?
- Coordinates: 7°01′33.4″N 73°19′27.8″W
- Region: Betulia, Santander
- Thickness at type section: 625 m (2,051 ft)
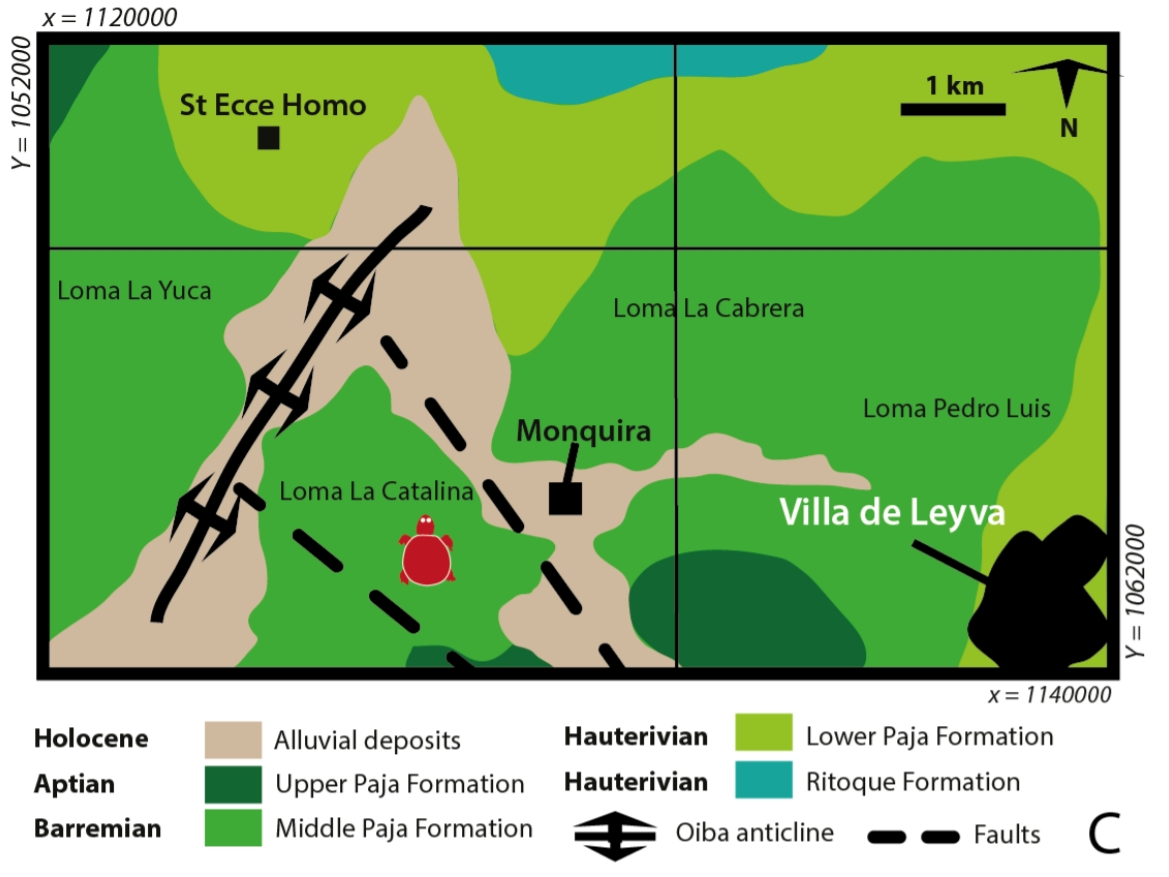
- Outcrops of the Paja Formation near Villa de Leyva

The Paja Formation (Spanish: Formación Paja, K1p, Kip, Kimp, b3b6p) is an Early Cretaceous geologic formation of central Colombia. The formation extends across the northern part of the Altiplano Cundiboyacense, the Western Colombian emerald belt and surrounding areas of the Eastern Ranges of the Colombian Andes. In the subsurface, the formation is found in the Middle Magdalena Valley to the west. The Paja Formation stretches across four departments, from north to south the southernmost Bolívar Department, in Santander, Boyacá and the northern part of Cundinamarca. Well known fossiliferous outcrops of the formation occur near Villa de Leyva, also written as Villa de Leiva, and neighboring Sáchica.

The formation was named after Quebrada La Paja in Betulia, Santander, and stretches across 450 kilometres (280 mi) from northeast to southwest. The Paja Formation overlies the Ritoque and Rosablanca Formations and is overlain by the San Gil Group and the Simití and Tablazo Formations and dates from the late Hauterivian to late Aptian. The Paja Formation comprises mudstones, shales and nodules of sandstones and limestones, deposited in an anoxic environment, in the warm and shallow sea that covered large parts of the present Colombian territory during the Cretaceous.

Initially considered to host Colombian emeralds, the emerald-bearing part was redefined as a separate formation; the Muzo Formation. The Paja Formation Lagerstätte is famous for its vertebrate fossils and is the richest Mesozoic fossiliferous formation of Colombia. Several marine reptile fossils of plesiosaurs, pliosaurs, ichthyosaurs and turtles have been described from the formation and it hosts the only dinosaur fossils described in the country to date; Padillasaurus. The formation also has provided many ammonites, fossil flora, decapods and the fossil shark Protolamna ricaurtei.

== Description ==
The Paja Formation was first described by O.C. Wheeler, according to Morales (1958), and named after Quebrada La Paja, a tributary of the Sogamoso River. The type section is exposed on the northern banks of the quebrada at the confluence of the Sogamoso River in Betulia, Santander.

The formation is divided into the Lutitas Negras Inferiores, Arcillolitas Abigarradas and Arcillolitas con Nódulos Huecos Members, and stretches across 450 kilometres (280 mi) from northeast to southwest. The Paja Formation overlies the Ritoque and Rosablanca Formations and is overlain by the Simití and Tablazo Formations and dates from the Hauterivian to Late Aptian.

=== Outcrops ===
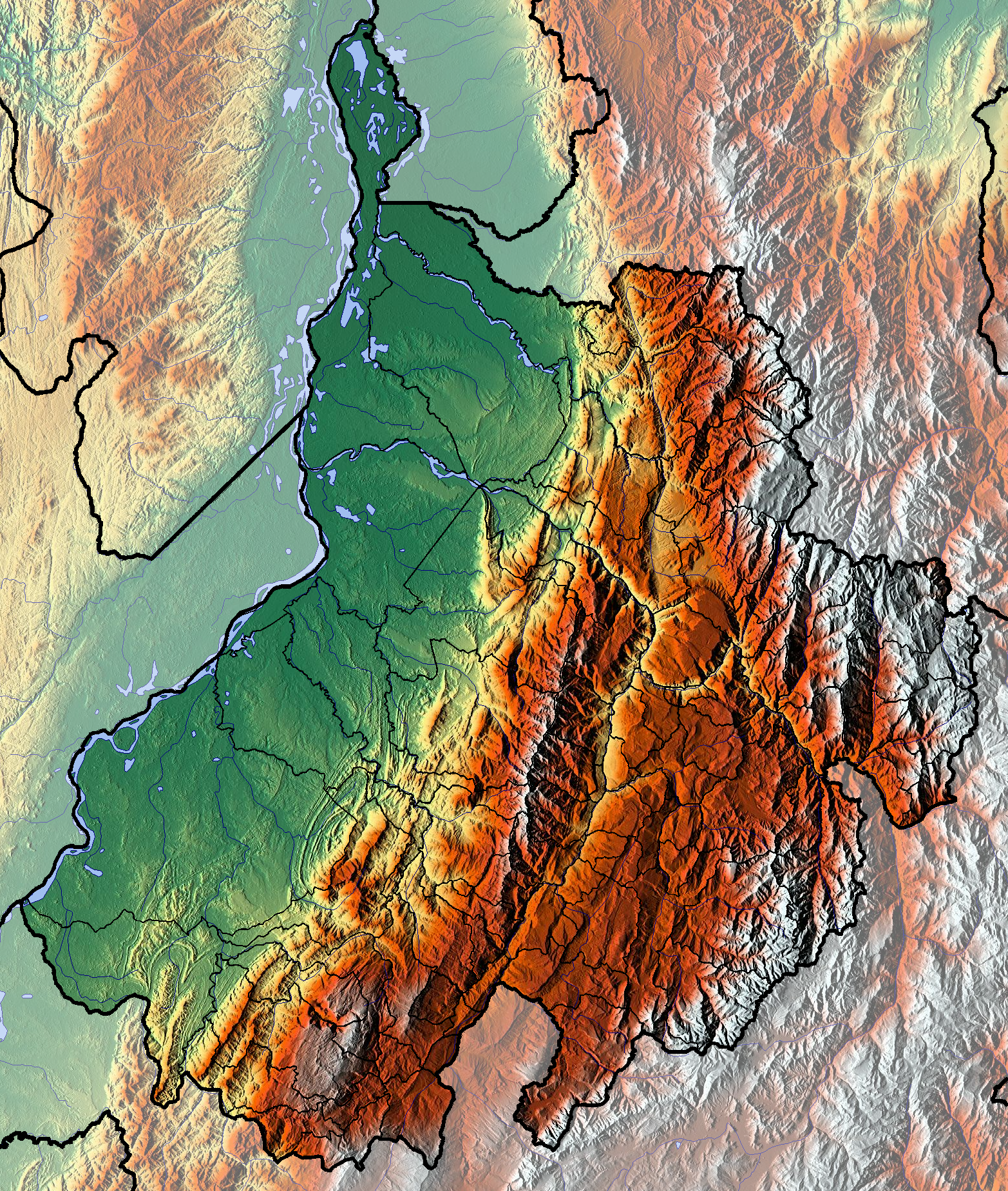
Type locality of the Paja Formation in Santander

The type section of the Paja Formation is found at the banks of Quebrada La Paja in Betulia, Santander, where the formation has a thickness of 625 metres (2,051 ft). Outcrops of the formation extend from Simití in the north, close to the border of Santander and Bolívar, where the formation is offset by the Simití Fault, to the Pauna Anticlinal in San Pablo de Borbur, where the formation is thrusted over the Ritoque Formation in the south. In the southern extension of the exposures, the formation crops out in the north of Tununguá, near the Ibacapí Fault.

Santander

In the Middle Magdalena Valley, south of Barrancabermeja, the Paja Formation in the subsurface is offset by the Casabe, Infantas and Arruga Faults. In the northeastern extent, in Río Negro, near the border with Norte de Santander, the formation is found in the subsurface, offset by the Lebríja Fault. The town center of Zapatoca rests on the formation in the synclinal named after the village. The Paja Formation also crops out in the northwestern part of the Middle Magdalena Valley, east of San Pablo, Bolívar, where in the formation underlies the Simití Formation and is offset in the subsurface by the Pozo Azul and Caña Braval Faults. South of there, the Paja Formation is offset by the La Corcovada and El Guineal Faults, and the regional La Salina Fault. Near the eponymous town, the formation is offset by the Landazurí Fault.

West of Barichara, the formation underlies the corregimiento Guane, Barichara and is found in the hills bordering both sides of the Suárez River. In this area, the Paja Formation is offset by the Suárez Fault. Surrounding Jordán, Santander, the formation crops out on both sides of the Chicamocha River in the Chicamocha Canyon. The touristic town San Gil rests on the formation and the Fonce River cuts into it. East of the town center, the formation is offset by the Curití and Ocamonte Faults. The urban centers of Oiba, San Benito, Encino, Ocamonte and Charalá are built on top of the Paja Formation. In this area, the formation is offset by the Confines and Encino Faults. Further to the south, the towns of Vélez, Guavatá and Jesús María rest on the formation. West of the latter, the Paja Formation is put in a reverse faulted contact with the Cumbre Formation. The El Carmen Fault puts the Paja Formation in contact with the Jurassic Girón Formation.

Boyacá

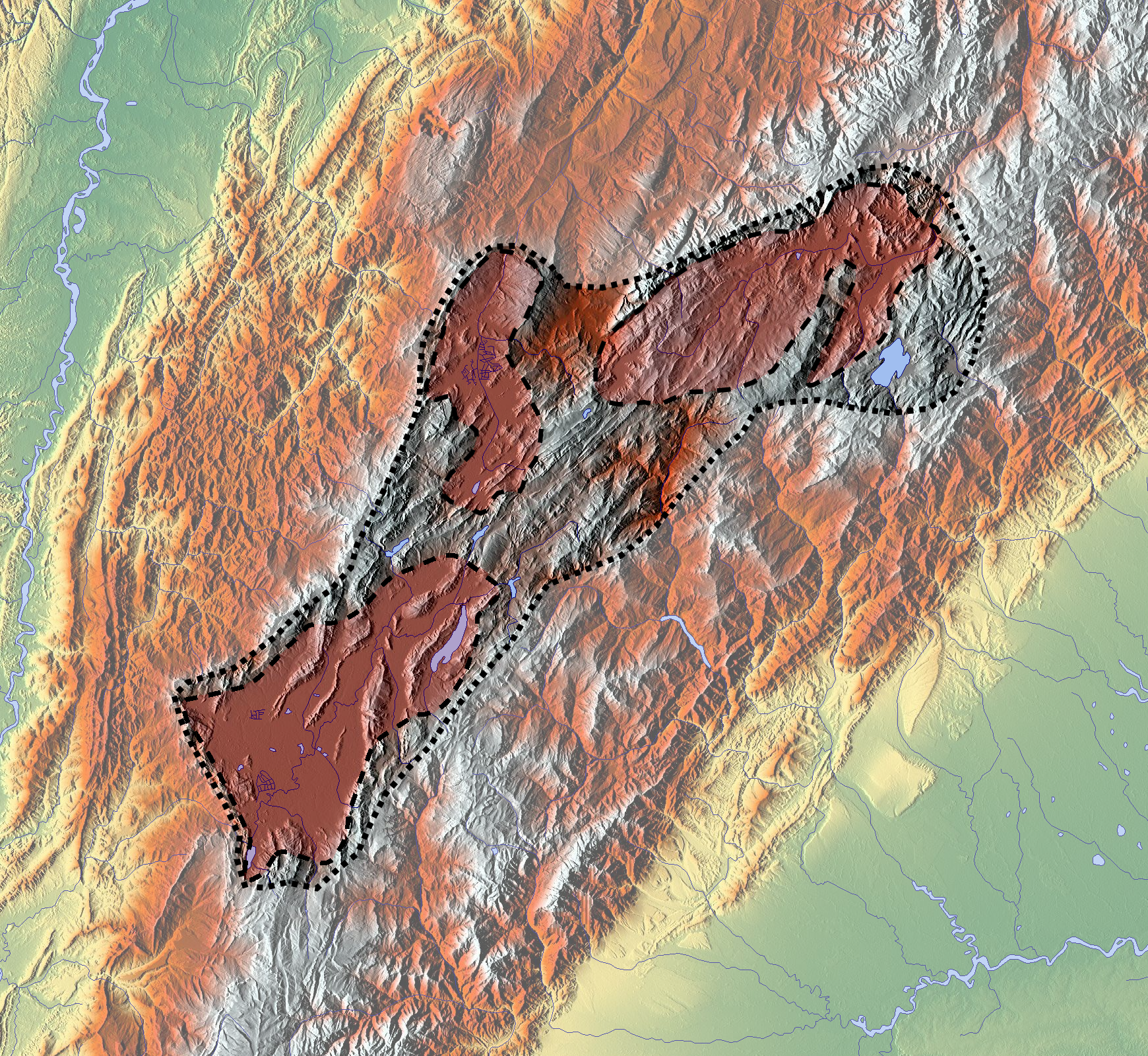
Fossiliferous outcrops near Villa de Leyva on the Altiplano Cundiboyacense

In northeastern Boyacá, the formation underlies the urban center of Moniquirá (not to be confused with Monquirá, a vereda of nearby Villa de Leyva) and is crossed by the Moniquirá River. West of Arcabuco in the Villa de Leyva Synclinal, the formation is cut by the Arcabuco River. In the vicinity of Pauna and San Pablo de Borbur, the formation crops out in an extensive area. Here, the Paja Formation is offset by the Río Minero and Pedro Gómez Faults and occurs in the footwall of the La Venta Fault. North of Lake Fúquene, the town centers of Tinjacá and Sutamarchán are built on top of the Paja Formation. In this area, the formation extends into the northern part of Cundinamarca, where the urban centers of Yacopí and La Palma rest on the formation.

=== Villa de Leyva ===
Surrounding the touristic town of Villa de Leyva, the formation crops out in the hills in a microclimatic location, known as the La Candelaria Desert (Spanish: Desierto de La Candelaria), stretching across Villa de Leyva, Santa Sofía and Sáchica. Along the highway Tunja-Villa de Leyva, the formation is heavily folded and faulted along a stretch of 500 metres (1,600 ft). In the vicinity of Villa de Leyva, the formation has provided many fossils of marine reptiles, as well as the dinosaur Padillasaurus.

=== Stratigraphy ===
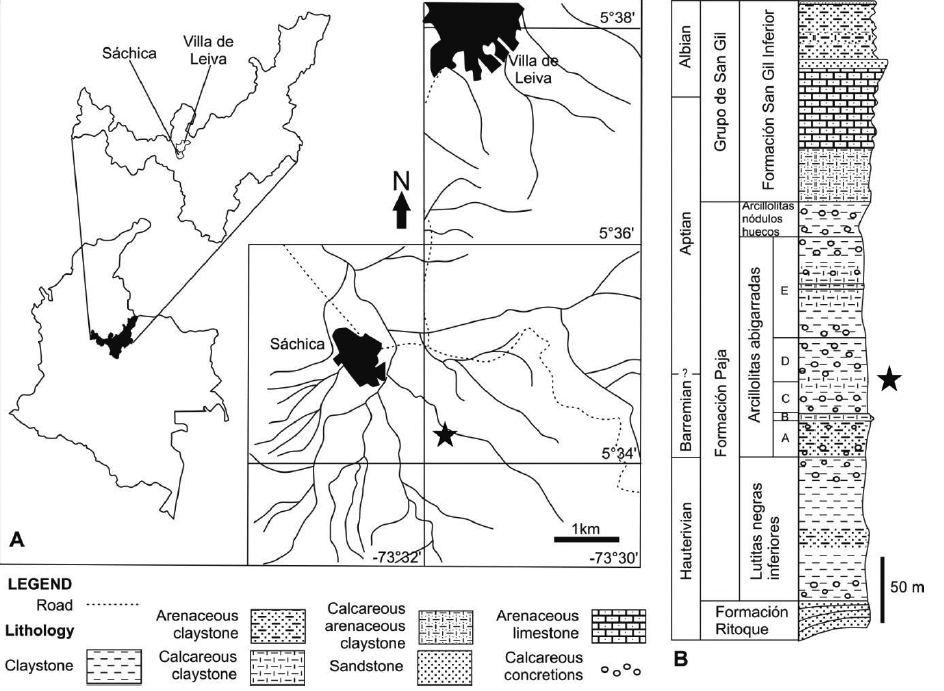
Stratigraphic column of the Paja Formation with Sachicasaurus site indicated

The Paja Formation overlies the Ritoque and Rosablanca Formations and is concordantly overlain by the San Gil Group and Tablazo Formations in the eastern extent, and the Simití Formation in the northwestern Middle Magdalena Valley. In the Western emerald belt, the contact with the Rosablanca Formation is concordant and abrupt. The total thickness of the formation varies across its extent, but can reach up to 940 metres (3,080 ft).

Members

The Paja Formation is subdivided into three members, from oldest to youngest:

- Lutitas Negras Inferiores (Lower Black Shales) – a sequence of 340 metres (1,120 ft) of black shales and sandy shales with a segment containing calcareous nodules. The age of this member is estimated at late Hauterivian, based on ammonites analyzed by Fernando Etayo.
- Arcillolitas Abigarradas (Mottled Claystones) – a series of multicolored claystones with abundant calcareous fossiliferous nodules, reaching a thickness of 480 metres (1,570 ft). In the upper 235 metres (771 ft) of this member, intercalations of gypsum occur. The age of the middle member of the Paja Formation is estimated at early Barremian to late Aptian on the basis of ammonites described by Fernando Etayo.
- Arcillolitas con Nódulos Huecos (Claystones with Hollow Nodules) – the upper member of the formation of approximately 174 metres (571 ft) thick consists of yellowish and grey claystones containing hollow nodules. Ammonite analysis has led to an estimated late Aptian age for the member.

In the northern part of the Middle Magdalena Valley, the Paja Formation comprises dark grey to blueish shales, intercalated with grey to yellowish fine-grained sandstones and fossiliferous limestones, locally with a sandy component. Bürgl in 1954 reported beds of tuff in the Paja Formation near Villa de Leyva. Thin section analysis of samples of the Paja Formation has provided insight in the micritic components of the sediments, where three microfacies were recognized; biomicritic wackestones, foraminiferous packstones and sandy biomicritic floatstones containing fragments of echinoderms, bivalves, crinoids and gastropods cemented by hematite.

The Paja Formation correlates with the Tibasosa Formation to the east on the northern Altiplano Cundiboyacense in Boyacá and with the El Peñón Formation pertaining to the Villeta Group to the south in the Eastern Ranges. The formation is laterally equivalent with the black shales of the Fómeque Formation in the eastern part of the Eastern Ranges and the sandstones of Las Juntas Formation in the Sierra Nevada del Cocuy. In the Middle Magdalena Valley to the west, the formation partly overlies and partly is laterally equivalent to the limestones of the Rosablanca Formation. The Paja Formation is diachronous with the Ritoque and Rosablanca Formations. To the northeast of the extent of the formation, it correlates with the upper part of the Río Negro Formation, and the lowermost Tibú-Mercedes Formation of the Catatumbo Basin.

== Paleogeography ==
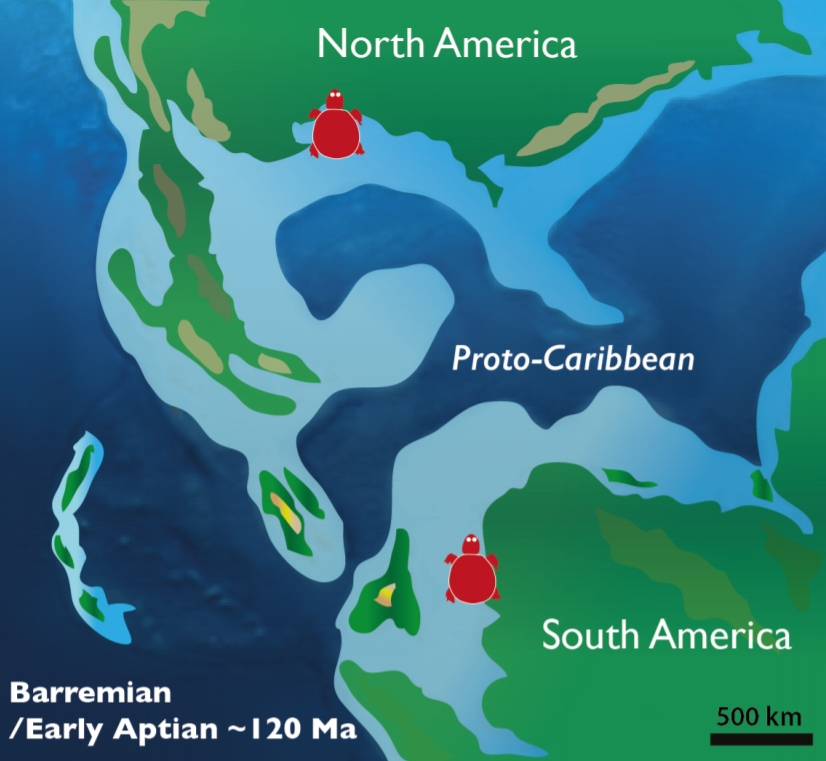
Paleogeography of northern South America during the Barremian and early Aptian

During deposition of the Paja Formation, the paleo coastline was oriented west–east.

From the late Aptian to early Albian, the area was covered by an extensive carbonate platform, in the extent of the Paja Formation represented by the San Gil Group, Tablazo Formation and Villeta Group.

=== Depositional environment ===
The thin section analysis led to the interpretation of a shoreface to lower shoreface environment, in the internal parts of a carbonate platform, where transgressions and regressions caused the variations in grain sizes and lithologies. The Barremian to Aptian sequence shows evidence of an overall relative sea level fall with open marine sedimentation in the lowest member and tidal deposits in the upper part of the formation.

One of the longest anoxic intervals of geologic history occurred during the Cretaceous, from about 125 to 80 Ma (early Aptian to early Campanian). During this Oceanic Anoxic Event, there were two spikes, the Selli event, dating to the early Aptian (approximately 120 Ma) was active during deposition of the black shales of the Paja Formation. The formation contains three spikes of δ^{13}C, with values above 1.5‰, in the lower, middle to upper and upper Paja Formation. These spikes indicate a global change in the carbon cycle and the preservation of organic matter due to poor oxygenation of sea waters. The cause of these elevated δ^{13}C levels may have been a global increase in volcanic activity.

== Mining and petroleum geology ==
The Paja Formation is one of the stratigraphic units cropping out in the Western emerald belt. Mineralization in the formation has been dated on the basis of ^{40}Ar/^{39}Ar analysis of muscovite minerals. In western San Pablo de Borbur, Boyacá, the mineralization dates to the Late Eocene at 36.4 ± 0.1 and 37.3 ± 0.1 Ma. In the northwestern part of Muzo, Boyacá, mineralization happened during the Early Oligocene, at 31.4 ± 0.3 Ma. Previous geologic researchers considered the Paja Formation hosted emeralds, and later definition of the stratigraphy of Colombia separated one of the main emerald formations of Colombia as the contemporaneous Barremian Muzo Formation, providing emeralds in the La Pita mine and important Coscuéz mine.

The Paja Formation is known for its gypsum deposits, which are mined and restricted to Santander. Near Guavatá, the formation hosts sphalerite and malachite and near Otanche, pyrite and galena are found in the formation. In Gámbita, the Paja Formation contains pyrite, galena and chalcopyrite. Other minerals occurring in the Paja Formation, are lead and zinc, around Paime and Yacopí, Cundinamarca.

The Paja Formation is considered a minor source rock in the Eastern Cordillera Basin and the Middle Magdalena Valley, with seal capacity for the underlying Rosablanca Formation reservoir in the latter basin. Vitrinite reflectance analysis on samples of the Paja Formation indicate an average value of 0.52 Ro, making the formation a marginal source rock.

== Paleontological significance ==
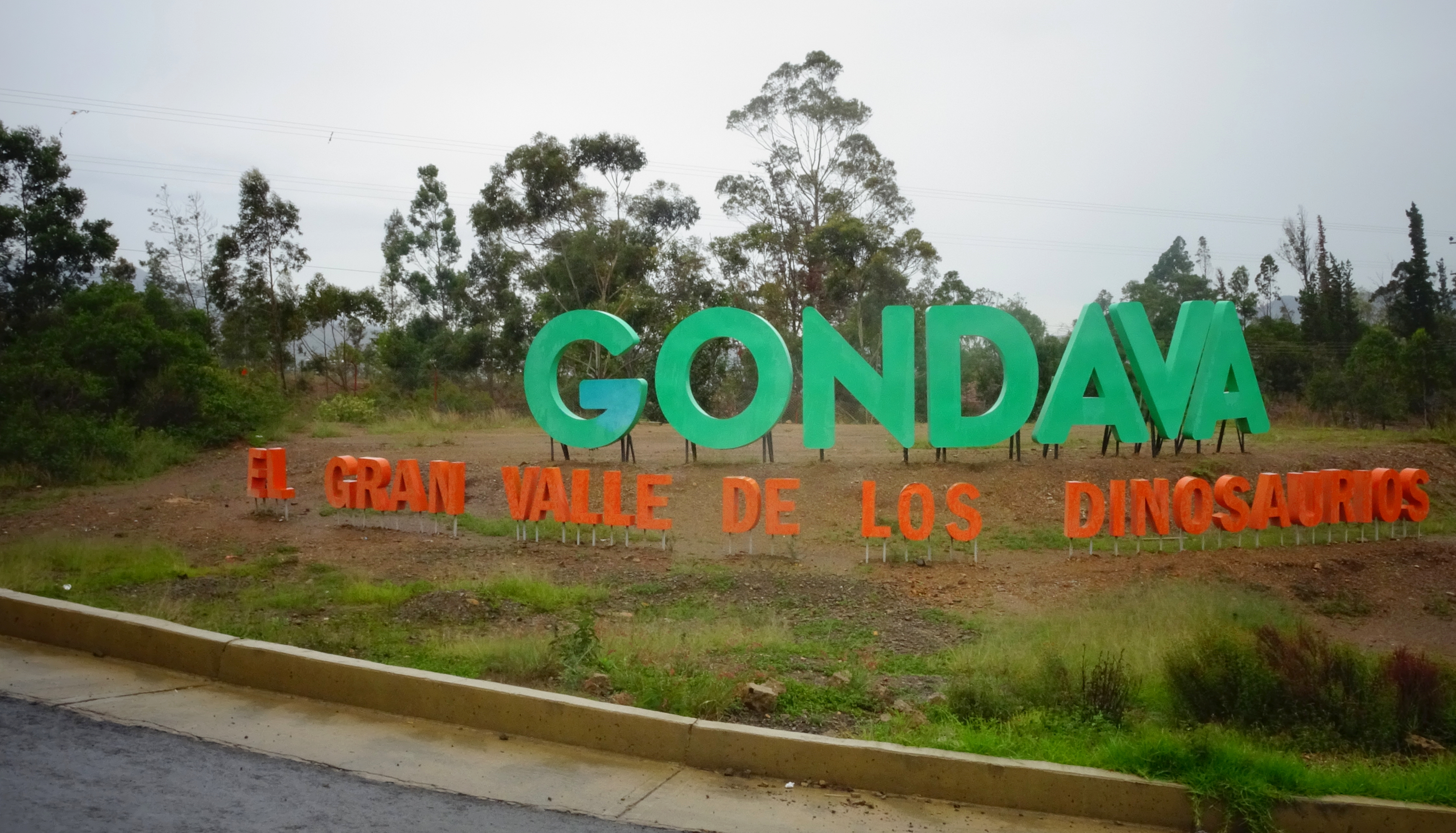
Gondava Dinosaur Park

The Paja Formation is the richest Mesozoic fossiliferous formation of Colombia. Fauna of dinosaurs, Padillasaurus, and various marine reptiles, among which plesiosaurs, ichthyosaurs, pliosaurs and turtles make up the vertebrate assemblage. Furthermore, many ammonites, the foraminifer Epistomina, decapods, flora and fossil fish have been recovered from the formation. Paja ammonites have been used in the walls and floor of the Convento del Santo Ecce Homo near Villa de Leyva.

In 2019, turtle expert Edwin Cadena described a fossil of Desmatochelys padillai who was found with her eggs still inside her.

Within the Arcillolitas Abigarradas Member of the Paja Formation, some horizons preserve abundant wood, which is frequently bored by pseudoplanktonic pholadoid bivalves, commonly referred to as "shipworms" or "piddocks". The presence of wood boring bivalves in Paja Formation seas indicates the continued presence of xylic substrates, and long residence time of floating wood.

The paleontological richness of the formation led to the establishment of a center of investigation; Centro de Investigaciones Paleontológicas (CIP), two museums; Paleontological Museum of Villa de Leyva, and Museo El Fósil, and a dinosaur park; Gondava, near Villa de Leyva.

=== IUGS geological heritage site ===
In respect of the 'world's most complete record of Lower Cretaceous marine reptiles and associated fauna', the International Union of Geological Sciences (IUGS) included the 'Marine Reptile Lagerstätte from the Lower Cretaceous of the Ricaurte Alto' in its assemblage of 100 'geological heritage sites' around the world in a listing published in October 2022. The organisation defines an IUGS Geological Heritage Site as 'a key place with geological elements and/or processes of international scientific relevance, used as a reference, and/or with a substantial contribution to the development of geological sciences through history.'

=== Fossil content ===
==== Reptiles ====
Reptiles of the Paja Formation
Genus	Species	Location	Member	Description	Notes	Image
Acostasaurus	A. pavachoquensis		Arcillolitas abigarradas	A pliosaurid with short snout, likely not a brachauchenine		
Boyacasaurus	B. sumercei		Arcillolitas abigarradas	A brachauchenine pliosaurid		
Callawayasaurus	C. colombiensis	Loma La Catalina	Arcillolitas abigarradas	An elasmosaurid plesiosaur, originally classified in Alzadasaurus		
Desmatochelys	D. padillai	Loma de Monsalve; Loma La Catalina	Arcillolitas abigarradas	A species of the genus Desmatochelys, sea turtles that belongs to the extinct family Protostegidae. Is the oldest known sea turtle, and a specimen was found with eggs still inside her.		
Monquirasaurus	M. boyacensis	Vereda Monquirá	Arcillolitas abigarradas	A large pliosaurid, initially named "Kronosaurus boyacensis"		
Leyvachelys	L. cipadi	Loma La Catalina	Arcillolitas abigarradas	A durophagous turtle member of the Sandownidae; is the first record for this group in South America. This species occurs too in the Glen Rose Formation in USA		
Leivanectes	L. bernadoi		Arcillolitas abigarradas	An elasmosaurid plesiosaur		
Muiscasaurus	M. catheti	Vereda Llanitos	Arcillolitas abigarradas	An ophthalmosaurid ichthyosaur, that it seems have occupied a different ecological niche respect to P. sachicarum		
Padillasaurus	P. leivaensis	La Tordolla	Arcillolitas abigarradas	A brachiosaurid dinosaur, that makes the first record of a terrestrial animal in the area, and the first Cretaceous brachiosaurid known outside from North America		
Platypterygius	P. elsuntuoso	Loma La Cabrera	Arcillotitas abigarradas	A platypterygiine ichthyosaur		
Kyhytysuka	K. sachicarum	Sáchica	Arcillolitas abigarradas	A platypterygiine ichthyosaur, relative of P. americanum		
Sachicasaurus	S. vitae	Sáchica	Arcillolitas abigarradas	A 10 metres (33 ft) subadult pliosaur		
Stenorhynchosaurus	S. munozi	Loma La Cabrera	Arcillolitas abigarradas	A small pliosaurid, over 3 meters in length. Formerly considered as a close relative of Brachauchenius lucasi from North America		
Teleosauroidea gen. indet.	species indet.		Arcillolitas abigarradas Mb.	Fossils of a member of Teleosauroidea with an estimated body length of 9.6 m, representing the most recent definitive record of Teleosauroidea reported		

==== Ammonites ====
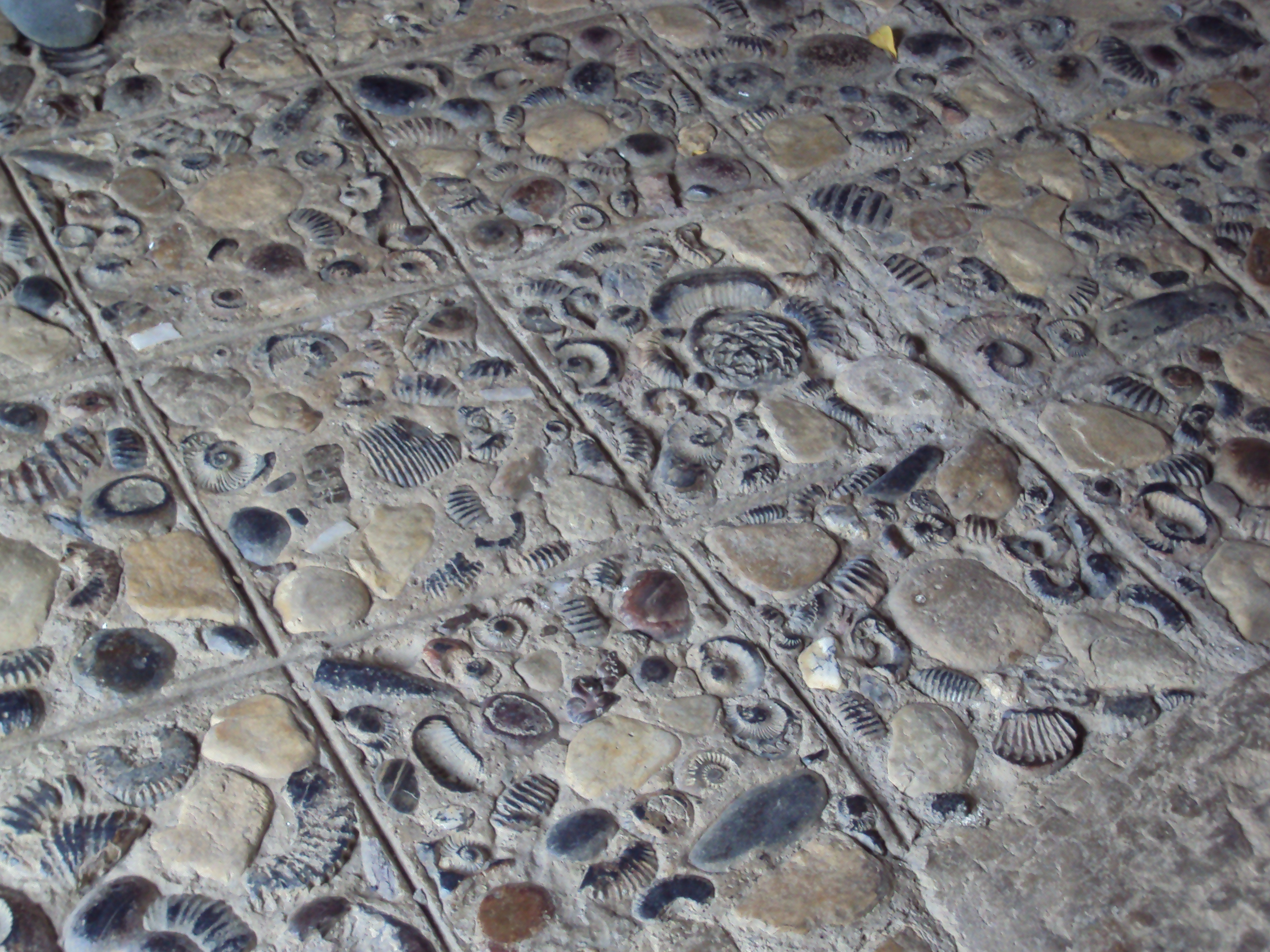
Ammonites of the Paja Formation in the floor of Convento del Santo Ecce Homo

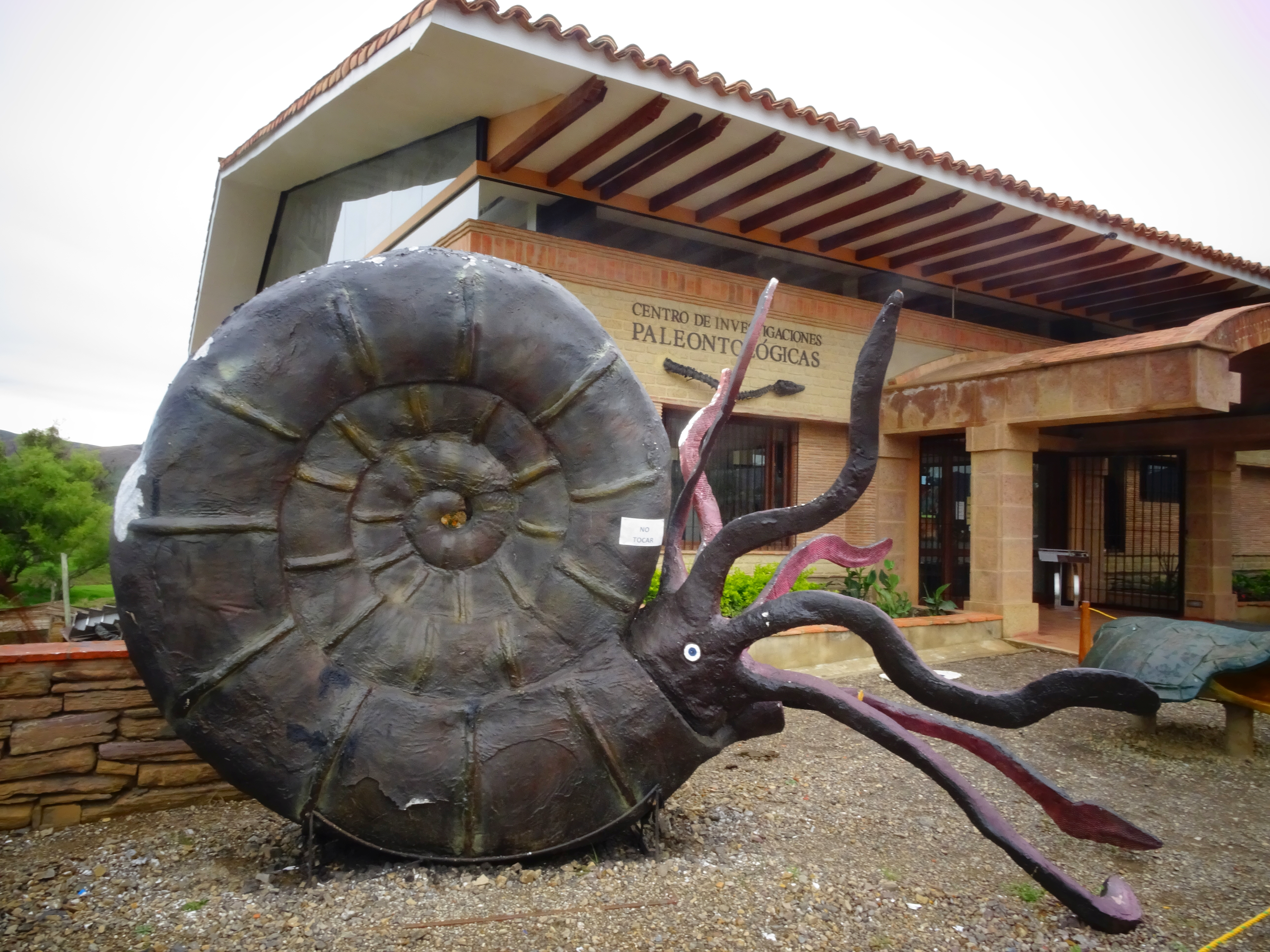
Centro de Investigaciones Paleontológicas

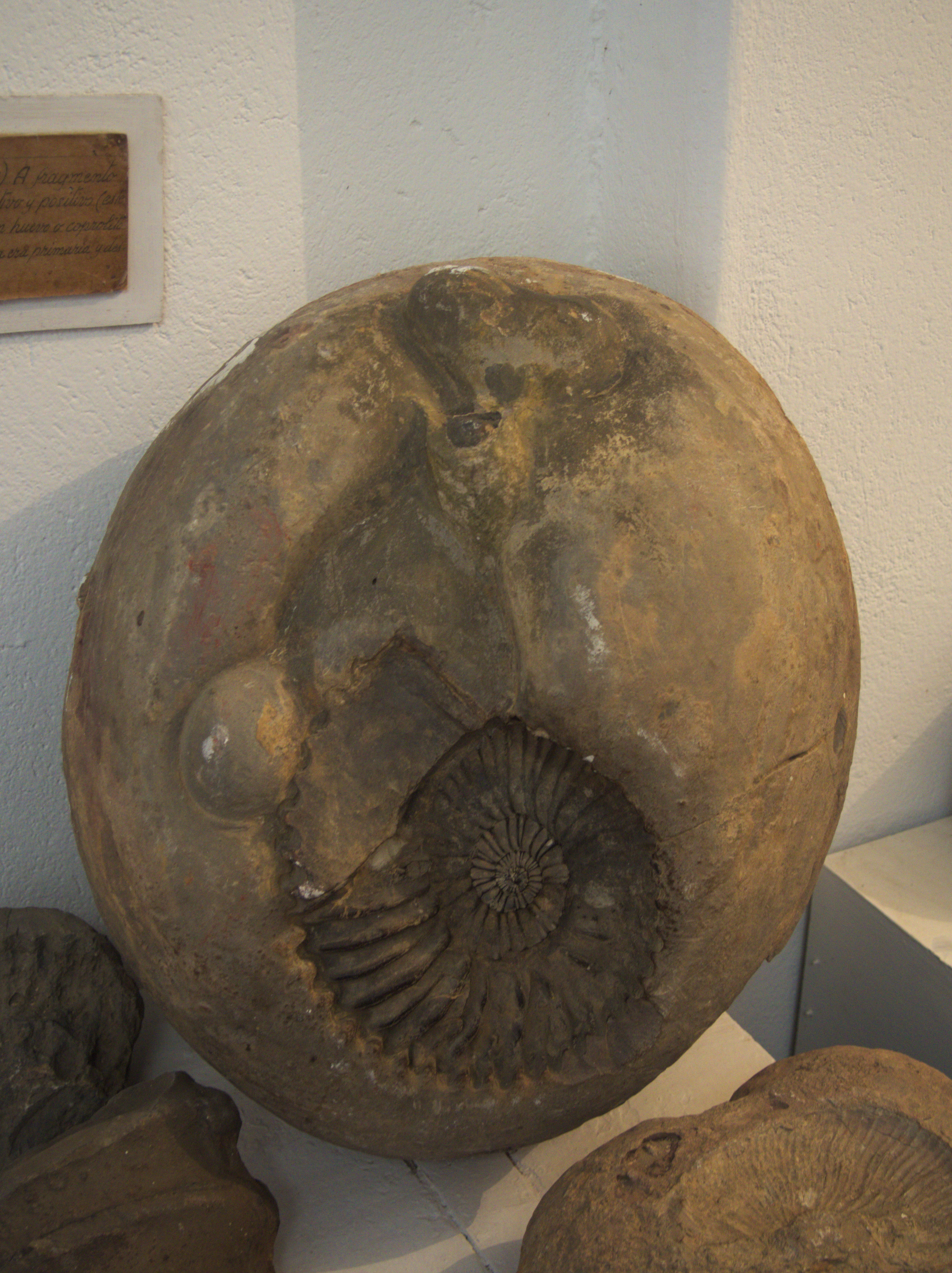
Ammonite in concretion in the Museo Paleontológico de Villa de Leyva

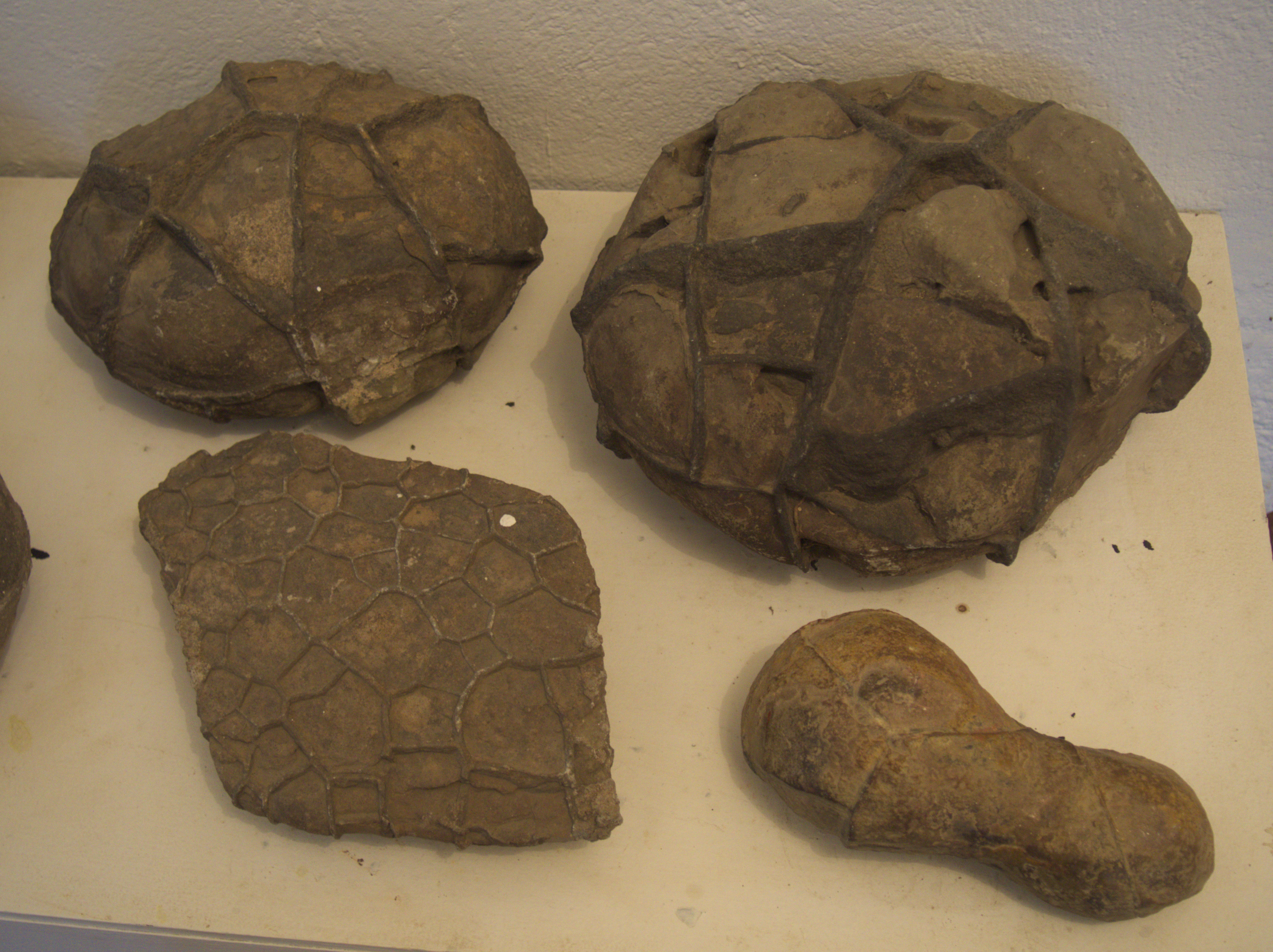
Septarian concretions in the museum

Ammonites of the Paja Formation
Species	Images	Notes
Acanthoptychoceras trumpyi		
Ancycloceras vandenheckii		
Ancycloceras vandenheckii velezianum		
Buergliceras buerglii		
Colchidites breistrofferi		
Crioceratites emerici		
Crioceratites leivaensis		
Crioceratites tener		
Hamiticeras chipatai		
Hamiticeras pilsbryi		
Hamulinites munieri		
Karsteniceras beyrichi		
Karsteniceras multicostatum		
Monsalveiceras monsalvense		
Nicklesia pulcella		
Pariacrioceras barremense		
Pedioceras asymmetricum		
Pedioceras caquesense		
Protanisoceras creutzbergi		
Pseudoaustraliceras columbiae		
Pseudoaustraliceras pavlowi		
Pseudoaustraliceras ramososeptatum		
Pseudocrioceras anthulai		
Ptychoceras puzosianum		
Tonohamites koeneni		
Criceratites sp.		
Pedioceras sp.		
Acanthohoplites		
Acrioceras julivertii		
Colchidites apolinarii		
Crioceratites portarum		
Favrella colombiana		
Heinzia (Gerhardtia) veleziensis		
Nicklesia didayana didayana		
Nicklesia didayana multifida		
Nicklesia dumasiana		
Nicklesia nolani		
Olcostephanus boussingaultii		
Parasaynoceras horridum		
Pseudohaploceras incertum		
Psilotissotia colombiana		
Pulchellia galeata		
Dufrenoyia sp.		
Valdedorsella sp.		

==== Crustaceans ====
Crustaceans of the Paja Formation
Species	Image	Notes
Bellcarcinus aptiensis		
Colombicarcinus laevis		
Notopocorystes kerri		
Planocarcinus olssoni		
Telamonocarcinus antiquus		

==== Flora ====
Flora of the Paja Formation
Species	Image	Notes
Frenelopsis cf. ramosissima		
Pseudofrenelopsis sp.		

==== Fish ====
- Protolamna ricaurtei
- Vinctifer sp.
- Ichthyodectidae

==== Ichnofossils ====
- Teredolites clavatus

== Regional correlations ==
Stratigraphy of the Llanos Basin and surrounding provinces
Ma	Age	Paleomap	Regional events	Catatumbo	Cordillera	proximal Llanos	distal Llanos	Putumayo	VSM	Environments	Maximum thickness	Petroleum geology	Notes
0.01	Holocene		Holocene volcanism Seismic activity	alluvium								Overburden	
1	Pleistocene		Pleistocene volcanism Andean orogeny 3 Glaciations	Guayabo	Soatá; Sabana	Necesidad	Guayabo	Gigante Neiva		Alluvial to fluvial (Guayabo)	550 m (1,800 ft) (Guayabo)	Overburden	
2.6	Pliocene		Pliocene volcanism Andean orogeny 3 GABI	Guayabo	Subachoque	Necesidad	Guayabo	Gigante Neiva		Alluvial to fluvial (Guayabo)	550 m (1,800 ft) (Guayabo)	Overburden	
5.3	Messinian		Andean orogeny 3 Foreland	Guayabo	Marichuela	Necesidad	Guayabo	Caimán	Honda	Alluvial to fluvial (Guayabo)	550 m (1,800 ft) (Guayabo)	Overburden	
13.5	Langhian		Regional flooding	León	hiatus	Caja	León	Caimán	Honda	Lacustrine (León)	400 m (1,300 ft) (León)	Seal	
16.2	Burdigalian		Miocene inundations Andean orogeny 2	C1	hiatus	Carbonera C1		Ospina	Honda	Proximal fluvio-deltaic (C1)	850 m (2,790 ft) (Carbonera)	Reservoir	
17.3	Burdigalian		Miocene inundations Andean orogeny 2	C2	hiatus	Carbonera C2		Ospina	Honda	Distal lacustrine-deltaic (C2)	850 m (2,790 ft) (Carbonera)	Seal	
19	Burdigalian		Miocene inundations Andean orogeny 2	C3	hiatus	Carbonera C3		Ospina	Honda	Proximal fluvio-deltaic (C3)	850 m (2,790 ft) (Carbonera)	Reservoir	
21	Early Miocene		Pebas wetlands	C4	hiatus	Carbonera C4		Ospina	Barzalosa	Distal fluvio-deltaic (C4)	850 m (2,790 ft) (Carbonera)	Seal	
23	Late Oligocene		Andean orogeny 1 Foredeep	C5	hiatus	Carbonera C5		Orito		Proximal fluvio-deltaic (C5)	850 m (2,790 ft) (Carbonera)	Reservoir	
25	Late Oligocene		Andean orogeny 1 Foredeep	C6	hiatus	Carbonera C6		Orito		Distal fluvio-lacustrine (C6)	850 m (2,790 ft) (Carbonera)	Seal	
28	Early Oligocene		Andean orogeny 1 Foredeep	C7	hiatus	C7		Pepino	Gualanday	Proximal deltaic-marine (C7)	850 m (2,790 ft) (Carbonera)	Reservoir	
32	Oligo-Eocene		Andean orogeny 1 Foredeep	C8	Usme	C8	onlap	Pepino	Gualanday	Marine-deltaic (C8)	850 m (2,790 ft) (Carbonera)	Seal; Source	
35	Late Eocene		Andean orogeny 1 Foredeep	Mirador	Usme	Mirador		Pepino	Gualanday	Coastal (Mirador)	240 m (790 ft) (Mirador)	Reservoir	
40	Middle Eocene		Andean orogeny 1 Foredeep	Mirador	Regadera	Mirador		Pepino	hiatus	Coastal (Mirador)	240 m (790 ft) (Mirador)	Reservoir	
45	Middle Eocene		Andean orogeny 1 Foredeep	Mirador	Regadera	Mirador		Pepino	hiatus	Coastal (Mirador)	240 m (790 ft) (Mirador)	Reservoir	
50	Early Eocene		Andean orogeny 1 Foredeep	Socha	Regadera	Los Cuervos		Pepino	hiatus	Deltaic (Los Cuervos)	260 m (850 ft) (Los Cuervos)	Seal; Source	
55	Late Paleocene		PETM; 2000 ppm CO_{2}	Los Cuervos	Bogotá	Los Cuervos		Pepino	Gualanday	Deltaic (Los Cuervos)	260 m (850 ft) (Los Cuervos)	Seal; Source	
60	Early Paleocene		SALMA	Barco	Guaduas	Barco		Rumiyaco	Gualanday	Fluvial (Barco)	225 m (738 ft) (Barco)	Reservoir	
65	Maastrichtian		KT extinction	Catatumbo	Guadalupe			Rumiyaco	Monserrate	Deltaic-fluvial (Guadalupe)	750 m (2,460 ft) (Guadalupe)	Reservoir	
72	Campanian		End of rifting	Colón-Mito Juan	Guadalupe			Rumiyaco	Monserrate	Deltaic-fluvial (Guadalupe)	750 m (2,460 ft) (Guadalupe)	Reservoir	
83	Santonian		End of rifting	Colón-Mito Juan	Guadalupe			Villeta/Güagüaquí		Deltaic-fluvial (Guadalupe)	750 m (2,460 ft) (Guadalupe)	Reservoir	
86	Coniacian		End of rifting	Colón-Mito Juan	Guadalupe			Villeta/Güagüaquí		Deltaic-fluvial (Guadalupe)	750 m (2,460 ft) (Guadalupe)	Reservoir	
89	Turonian		Cenomanian-Turonian anoxic event	La Luna	Chipaque	Gachetá	hiatus	Villeta/Güagüaquí		Restricted marine (all)	500 m (1,600 ft) (Gachetá)	Source	
93	Cenomanian		Rift 2	La Luna	Chipaque	Gachetá	hiatus	Villeta/Güagüaquí		Restricted marine (all)	500 m (1,600 ft) (Gachetá)	Source	
100	Albian		Rift 2	La Luna	Une	Une	hiatus	Caballos		Deltaic (Une)	500 m (1,600 ft) (Une)	Reservoir	
113	Aptian		Rift 2	Capacho	Fómeque	Une	hiatus	Motema	Yaví	Open marine (Fómeque)	800 m (2,600 ft) (Fómeque)	Source (Fóm)	
125	Barremian		High biodiversity	Aguardiente	Paja	Une	hiatus	Motema	Yaví	Shallow to open marine (Paja)	940 m (3,080 ft) (Paja)	Reservoir	
129	Hauterivian		Rift 1	Tibú- Mercedes	Las Juntas	hiatus	hiatus	Motema	Yaví	Deltaic (Las Juntas)	910 m (2,990 ft) (Las Juntas)	Reservoir (LJun)	
133	Valanginian		Rift 1	Río Negro	Cáqueza; Macanal; Rosablanca	hiatus	hiatus	Motema	Yaví	Restricted marine (Macanal)	2,935 m (9,629 ft) (Macanal)	Source (Mac)	
140	Berriasian		Rift 1	Girón	Cáqueza; Macanal; Rosablanca	hiatus	hiatus	Motema	Yaví	Restricted marine (Macanal)	2,935 m (9,629 ft) (Macanal)	Source (Mac)	
145	Tithonian		Break-up of Pangea	Jordán	Arcabuco	Buenavista Batá	hiatus	Saldaña		Alluvial, fluvial (Buenavista)	110 m (360 ft) (Buenavista)	"Jurassic"	
150	Early-Mid Jurassic		Passive margin 2	La Quinta	Montebel Noreán	hiatus	hiatus	Saldaña		Coastal tuff (La Quinta)	100 m (330 ft) (La Quinta)	"Jurassic"	
201	Late Triassic		Passive margin 2	Mucuchachi	Montebel Noreán	hiatus	hiatus	Payandé				"Jurassic"	
235	Early Triassic		Pangea		hiatus	hiatus	hiatus					"Paleozoic"	
250	Permian		Pangea		hiatus	hiatus	hiatus					"Paleozoic"	
300	Late Carboniferous		Famatinian orogeny		hiatus	hiatus	hiatus		Cerro Neiva ()			"Paleozoic"	
340	Early Carboniferous		Fossil fish Romer's gap		Cuche (355-385)	Farallones ()			Cerro Neiva ()	Deltaic, estuarine (Cuche)	900 m (3,000 ft) (Cuche)	"Paleozoic"	
360	Late Devonian		Passive margin 1	Río Cachirí (360-419)	Cuche (355-385)	Farallones ()			Ambicá ()	Alluvial-fluvial-reef (Farallones)	2,400 m (7,900 ft) (Farallones)	"Paleozoic"	
390	Early Devonian		High biodiversity	Floresta (387-400) El Tíbet					Ambicá ()	Shallow marine (Floresta)	600 m (2,000 ft) (Floresta)	"Paleozoic"	
410	Late Silurian		Silurian mystery	Floresta (387-400) El Tíbet								"Paleozoic"	
425	Early Silurian		Silurian mystery	hiatus								"Paleozoic"	
440	Late Ordovician		Rich fauna in Bolivia	San Pedro (450-490)		Duda ()						"Paleozoic"	
470	Early Ordovician		First fossils	San Pedro (450-490)	Busbanzá (>470±22) Chuscales Otengá	Guape ()		Río Nevado ()	Hígado () Agua Blanca; Venado (470-475)			"Paleozoic"	
488	Late Cambrian		Regional intrusions	Chicamocha (490-515)	Quetame ()	Ariarí ()		SJ del Guaviare (490-590)	San Isidro ()			"Paleozoic"	
515	Early Cambrian		Cambrian explosion		Quetame ()			SJ del Guaviare (490-590)	San Isidro ()			"Paleozoic"	
542	Ediacaran		Break-up of Rodinia		pre-Quetame		post-Parguaza	SJ del Guaviare (490-590)	El Barro ()	Yellow: allochthonous basement (Chibcha terrane); Green: autochthonous basement (Río Negro-Juruena Province)		Basement	
600	Neoproterozoic		Cariri Velhos orogeny	Bucaramanga (600-1400)	pre-Quetame		post-Parguaza	pre-Guaviare	El Barro ()	Yellow: allochthonous basement (Chibcha terrane); Green: autochthonous basement (Río Negro-Juruena Province)		Basement	
800	Neoproterozoic		Snowball Earth	Bucaramanga (600-1400)	pre-Quetame		post-Parguaza	pre-Guaviare	El Barro ()	Yellow: allochthonous basement (Chibcha terrane); Green: autochthonous basement (Río Negro-Juruena Province)		Basement	
1000	Mesoproterozoic		Sunsás orogeny	Bucaramanga (600-1400)	pre-Quetame	Ariarí (1000)	post-Parguaza	pre-Guaviare	La Urraca (1030-1100)	Yellow: allochthonous basement (Chibcha terrane); Green: autochthonous basement (Río Negro-Juruena Province)		Basement	
1300	Mesoproterozoic		Rondônia-Juruá orogeny	Bucaramanga (600-1400)	pre-Quetame	pre-Ariarí	Parguaza (1300-1400)	pre-Guaviare	Garzón (1180-1550)	Yellow: allochthonous basement (Chibcha terrane); Green: autochthonous basement (Río Negro-Juruena Province)		Basement	
1400	Mesoproterozoic		Rondônia-Juruá orogeny	pre-Bucaramanga	pre-Quetame	pre-Ariarí		pre-Guaviare	Garzón (1180-1550)	Yellow: allochthonous basement (Chibcha terrane); Green: autochthonous basement (Río Negro-Juruena Province)		Basement	
1600	Paleoproterozoic		Rondônia-Juruá orogeny	pre-Bucaramanga	pre-Quetame	pre-Ariarí	Maimachi (1500-1700)	pre-Guaviare	pre-Garzón	Yellow: allochthonous basement (Chibcha terrane); Green: autochthonous basement (Río Negro-Juruena Province)		Basement	
1800	Paleoproterozoic		Tapajós orogeny	pre-Bucaramanga	pre-Quetame	pre-Ariarí	Mitú (1800)	pre-Guaviare	pre-Garzón	Yellow: allochthonous basement (Chibcha terrane); Green: autochthonous basement (Río Negro-Juruena Province)		Basement	
1950	Paleoproterozoic		Transamazonic orogeny	pre-Bucaramanga	pre-Quetame	pre-Ariarí	pre-Mitú	pre-Guaviare	pre-Garzón	Yellow: allochthonous basement (Chibcha terrane); Green: autochthonous basement (Río Negro-Juruena Province)		Basement	
2200	Paleoproterozoic		Columbia	pre-Bucaramanga	pre-Quetame	pre-Ariarí	pre-Mitú	pre-Guaviare	pre-Garzón	Yellow: allochthonous basement (Chibcha terrane); Green: autochthonous basement (Río Negro-Juruena Province)		Basement	
2530	Archean		Carajas-Imataca orogeny	pre-Bucaramanga	pre-Quetame	pre-Ariarí	pre-Mitú	pre-Guaviare	pre-Garzón	Yellow: allochthonous basement (Chibcha terrane); Green: autochthonous basement (Río Negro-Juruena Province)		Basement	
3100	Archean		Kenorland	pre-Bucaramanga	pre-Quetame	pre-Ariarí	pre-Mitú	pre-Guaviare	pre-Garzón	Yellow: allochthonous basement (Chibcha terrane); Green: autochthonous basement (Río Negro-Juruena Province)		Basement	

Legend

- group
- important formation
- fossiliferous formation
- minor formation
- (age in Ma)
- proximal Llanos (Medina) (Note: based on Duarte et al. (2019), García González et al. (2009), and geological report of Villavicencio)
- distal Llanos (Saltarin 1A well) (Note: based on Duarte et al. (2019) and the hydrocarbon potential evaluation performed by the UIS and ANH in 2009)

=== Panorama ===
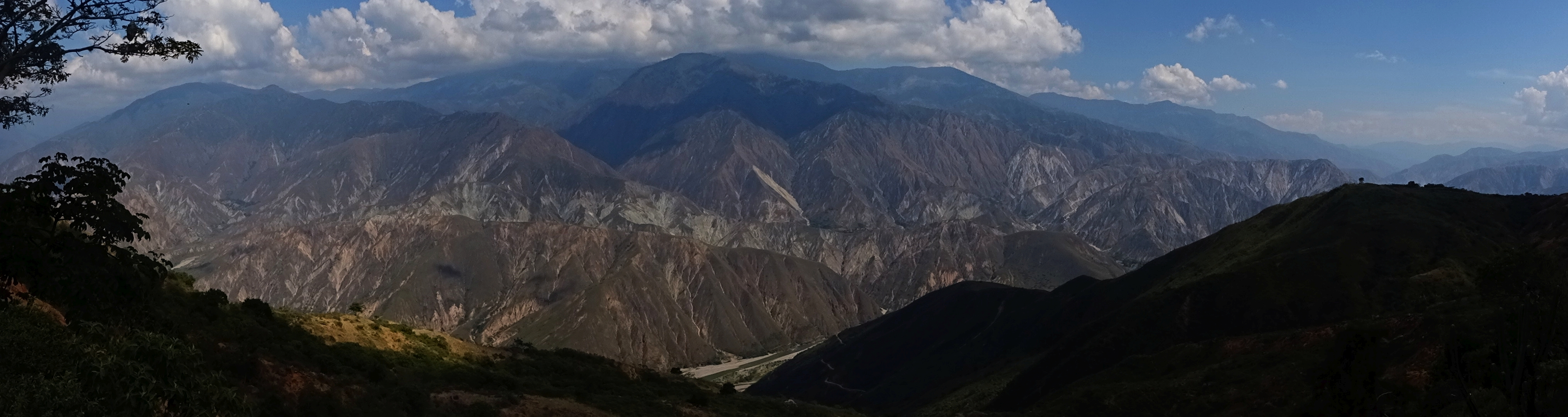
Panorama of the Chicamocha Canyon, from bottom to top; Jurassic Jordán and Girón Formations, and the Cretaceous Rosablanca and Paja Formations

== See also ==
- Plesiosaur stratigraphic distribution
- Floresta Formation, Devonian fossiliferous formation of the Altiplano Cundiboyacense
- Cerrejón Formation, Paleocene fossiliferous formation of northeastern Colombia
- Honda Group, Miocene Lagerstätte of the Upper Magdalena Valley
- La Amarga Formation, contemporaneous fossiliferous formation of the Neuquén Basin in Argentina
- Cerro Barcino Formation, contemporaneous fossiliferous formation of the Cañadón Asfalto Basin in Argentina
- Río Belgrano Formation, contemporaneous fossiliferous formation of the Austral Basin in Argentina
- Camarillas Formation, contemporaneous fossiliferous formation of the Galve Basin in Spain
