= Girón Formation =

Geologic formation in Colombia

- Stratigraphic range: Late Jurassic; ~160–150 Ma
- Type: Geological formation
- Underlies: Rosablanca, Río Negro, Tambor & Tibú-Mercedes Formations
- Overlies: Bucaramanga Gneiss, Arboleda Granite, Diamante, Floresta, Bocas & Jordán Formations
- Thickness: Up to 3,346 m (10,978 ft)

Lithology
- Primary: Sandstone, siltstone, conglomerate
- Other: Shale, claystone, rhyolite, tuff

Location
- Location: Mesa de Los Santos & Altiplano Cundiboyacense; Eastern Ranges, Andes
- Coordinates: 6°46′17″N 73°02′30″W
- Region: Santander, Norte de Santander, Boyacá
- Country: Colombia
- Extent: 325 km (202 mi)

Type section
- Named for: Girón
- Named by: Hettner (1892); Langenheim
- Location: Lebrija River
- Year defined: 1954
- Coordinates: 7°11′39″N 74°09′13″W
- Region: Santander
- Country: Colombia
- Thickness at type section: 3,346 m (10,978 ft)
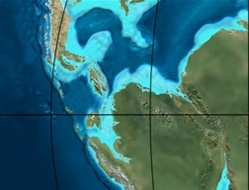
- Paleogeography of Northern South America; 150 Ma, by Ron Blakey

The Girón Formation (Spanish: Formación Girón, Jg) is an extensive geological formation stretching across 325 kilometres (202 mi) from the north in Teorama, Norte de Santander, across the Mesa de Los Santos and Chicamocha Canyon towards west of Nobsa, Boyacá in the northern part of the Altiplano Cundiboyacense in the south. The formation extends across the northern and central part of the Eastern Ranges of the Colombian Andes.

The formation forms the basement in the Middle Magdalena Valley and is forming the Serranía de Los Cobardes. The Girón Formation consists of thickly bedded red sandstones, shales, siltstones and conglomerates deposited in a terrestrial alluvial and fluvial to fluvio-lacustrine environment in an extensional basin setting. The formation dates to the Late Jurassic period and has a maximum thickness of 3,346 metres (10,978 ft) at its type locality in the valley of the Lebrija River.

== Definition ==
The formation was first defined by Hettner in 1892 and named after Girón, close to Bucaramanga, Santander. The type locality was defined by Langenheim in 1954 in the valley of the Lebrija River. The formation was studied by various authors in the 1940s, Oppenheim in 1940, Dickey in 1941 and Trumpy in 1943, who described the formation as a lateral equivalent of the La Quinta Formation of northern Colombia and western Venezuela. Julivert (1958) assigned a thickness of 2,500 metres (8,200 ft), while Navas in 1963 observed a thickness of 2,690 metres (8,830 ft). Cediel in the same year defined the thickness at its type locality of 4,650 metres (15,260 ft) and divided the formation in seven units. Research by Osorio and Velandia, published in 2015, concluded a maximum thickness of 3,346 metres (10,978 ft) at the type locality. On the Cáchira Páramo in Norte de Santander, the thickness is 1,140 metres (3,740 ft).

== Description ==
The Girón Formation extends over a distance of about 325 kilometres (202 mi) from Teorama in Norte de Santander in the north to Nobsa in Boyacá in the south, stretching across three departments; Norte de Santander, Santander and Boyacá.

=== Lithologies ===
The Girón Formation is characterized by a thick sequence of red feldspathic and micaceaous sandstones and thinly bedded reddish siltstones, conglomerates with quartz and lithic clasts, shales with white spots and purple to dark red claystones. In the south, the formation includes fragments of schists, quartzites, and red and green limonite. The middle part of the sequence contains alternating greyish green sandstones and red to purple siltstones in beds up to 1.5 metres (4.9 ft). In the Middle Magdalena Valley (VMM), the Girón Formation has been drilled and proved to comprise rhyolitic, rhyodacitic flows and tuffs. To the southeast of Cáchira, Norte de Santander, andesitic porphyry copper deposits in mineralizations of chalcopyrite and bornite occur in the Girón Formation.

=== Stratigraphy and depositional environment ===
The Girón Formation in large areas of its extent overlies the Precambrian Bucaramanga Gneiss, in the northern area the Arboleda Granite, and the Carboniferous to Permian Diamante Formation in the area around Toledo, Norte de Santander. In this part, the formation is overlain by the Río Negro and Tibú-Mercedes Formations.

In the central area at the type locality in the Lebrija River valley, the formation unconformably overlies the Bocas Formation and is overlain by the Tambor Formation. On the Mesa de Los Santos and the Bucaramanga Massif, the formation overlies the Jordán Formation with an angular unconformity dipping 10 to 15°. In the central part it is overlain by the Rosablanca Formation. In the southernmost extent of the formation, along the road from Busbanzá to Corrales, the Girón Formation unconformably rests upon the Floresta Formation. The formation forms the economic basement in the Middle Magdalena Valley.

The age has been estimated to be Late Jurassic, ranging from Oxfordian to Tithonian, based on ostracods and palynomorphs. Stratigraphically, the formation is time equivalent with the Buena Vista Breccia of the proximal area of the Llanos Basin and the Arcabuco Formation to the west of the Boyacá Fault.

The formation was deposited in an alluvial to fluvial or fluvio-lacustrine terrestrial environment, with fast-flowing braided rivers and in certain parts meandering river deposition to a deltaic environment. Towards the top of the stratigraphic unit, the deposition became shallow marine. The overall tectonic regime represented an extensional basin setting. The rifting of the Jurassic and Early Cretaceous, resulting from the break-up of Pangea, caused large variations in thickness of the Girón Formation.

==== Provenance ====
The grains composing the Girón Formation have been analyzed using X-ray diffraction, resulting in quartz as principal component (73 to 97%), and clay minerals belonging to the kaolinite group (2 to 4%) and illite-mica (3-19%). It has been suggested a main component of the provenance for the sediments was the Devonian Floresta Formation.

=== Tectonics ===
Norte de Santander	Santander
Extent of the Girón Formation; Northernmost outcrop in Teorama, Norte de Santander; Type locality at the Lebrija River, Santander; Outcrop in the Chicamocha Canyon, Santander; Southernmost outcrop in Nobsa, Boyacá

The Girón Formation probably deposited as a result of regional uplift of the Santander and Floresta Massifs in the Late Jurassic. The formation is folded in an anticline around the type locality producing the Los Cobardes Anticlinal that extends to Contratación. Transpressive tectonic movements after deposition produced five sets of fractures; an asymmetrical group of NW-SE, NW-SE, and E-W fractures and a set symmetrical with the general anticline at NNE-SSW and ESE-WNW. Pervasive cleavage exists in the formation at the Floresta Massif. Magnetization analysis performed in 2005 by Ayala et al. showed clockwise rotation of the formation in the southern area around Paz de Río of 31 ± 18° and Nobsa of 40 ± 18° respectively. The Girón Formation is put into contact with the Cretaceous La Luna Formation in Norte de Santander, and is present in the hanging wall of the Bituima-La Salina Fault and cross-cut by several faults, among which the Suárez, Cáchira, and the regional Bucaramanga-Santa Marta Fault.

== Outcrops ==
The Girón Formation is found, apart from its type locality in the Lebrija River valley in Santander, stretching from the north around Teorama, Norte de Santander, to the south west of Nobsa in Boyacá. The formation crops out along the Colombia-Venezuela border in Toledo, Norte de Santander, and the urban center of Hacarí is built on top of the Girón Formation. The formation forms the Serranía de Los Cobardes in the western front of the Eastern Ranges and is found throughout the Chicamocha Canyon, and the Sogamoso River cuts through the Girón Formation.

The Girón Formation also crops out along the highway from Bucaramanga to Piedecuesta where frequent landslides of the fractured rocks occur in the rainy season.

== See also ==
- Geology of the Altiplano Cundiboyacense
- Geology of the Ocetá Páramo
- Cesar-Ranchería Basin
- Guavio Formation
- Valle Alto Formation
