= Toledo Municipality =

Toledo Municipality may refer to:

- Toledo Municipality, Oruro, Bolivia
- Toledo, Norte de Santander, Colombia
