= Suárez Fault =

- Falla del Suárez
- Location within Colombia
- Etymology: Suárez River
- Coordinates: 06°35′48″N 73°18′16″W
- Country: Colombia
- Region: Andean
- State: Santander
- Cities: Bucaramanga

Characteristics
- Range: Eastern Ranges, Andes
- Part of: Andean oblique faults
- Length: 98.3 km (61.1 mi)
- Strike: 021.1 ± 8
- Dip: West
- Dip angle: 60-90
- Displacement: 0.1 mm (0.0039 in)/yr

Tectonics
- Plate: North Andean
- Status: Inactive
- Type: Oblique thrust fault
- Movement: Sinistral reverse
- Rock units: Girón Fm., Paja Fm., Rosablanca Fm., Simití Fm.
- Age: Quaternary
- Orogeny: Andean

The Suárez Fault (Spanish: Falla del Suárez) is a sinistral oblique thrust fault in the department of Santander in northeastern Colombia. The fault has a total length of 98.3 kilometres (61.1 mi) and runs along an average north-northeast to south-southwest strike of 021.1 ± 8 in the Eastern Ranges of the Colombian Andes from Barbosa in the south to Bucaramanga in the north, where it connects with the regional Bucaramanga-Santa Marta Fault.

== Etymology ==
The fault is named after the Suárez River.

== Description ==
The Suárez Fault runs from Barbosa in the south, where it displaces the Simití Formation, and joins the Bucaramanga Fault a few kilometers to the north of the city of Bucaramanga. The Suárez Fault cuts Jurassic (Girón Formation), and Cretaceous sedimentary rocks (Simití, Rosablanca and Paja Formations), and Quaternary alluvial deposits and mud flows that form the "Bucaramanga Terrace". The trace of the fault is well defined, controls linear drainages such as the Suárez River for several kilometers, has sag ponds, and locally dams alluvium. The fault vertically offsets debris flows in the area of Girón and La Fuente and displaces a Tertiary erosion surface. The slip rate is estimated at 0.1 millimetres (0.0039 in) per year on the basis of displaced Quaternary deposits.

== See also ==
- List of earthquakes in Colombia
- Cimitarra Fault
