= Ritoque Formation =

Geological formation in the Colombian Andes

- Stratigraphic range: Early Hauterivian; ~132–128 Ma
- Type: Geological formation
- Underlies: Paja Formation
- Overlies: Rosablanca Fm., Arcabuco Fm.
- Thickness: 70–110 m (230–360 ft)

Lithology
- Primary: Siltstone
- Other: Limestone

Location
- Coordinates: 4°27′07″N 74°03′20″W
- Region: Altiplano Cundiboyacense; Eastern Ranges, Andes
- Country: Colombia

Type section
- Named for: Vereda Ritoque, Villa de Leyva
- Named by: Etayo
- Location: Villa de Leyva
- Year defined: 1968
- Coordinates: 4°27′07″N 74°03′20″W
- Region: Boyacá, Santander
- Country: Colombia

The Ritoque Formation (Spanish: Formación Ritoque, Kiri, Kirt) is a geological formation of the Altiplano Cundiboyacense, Eastern Ranges of the Colombian Andes. The formation consists of grey siltstones, limestones and fine sandstones intercalated. The formation dates to the Early Cretaceous period; Early Hauterivian epoch and varies in thickness between 70 and 110 metres (230 and 360 ft).

== Definition ==
The formation was first defined and named by Etayo in 1968 after the vereda Ritoque of Villa de Leyva.

== Description ==
=== Lithologies ===
The Ritoque Formation is characterised by a sequence of grey siltstones, limestones and sandstones with a thickness between 70 and 110 metres (230 and 360 ft).

=== Stratigraphy and depositional environment ===
The Ritoque Formation overlies the Rosablanca and Arcabuco Formations and is overlain by the Paja Formation. The age has been estimated to be Early Hauterivian. Stratigraphically, the formation is time equivalent with the Macanal Formation.

== Outcrops ==
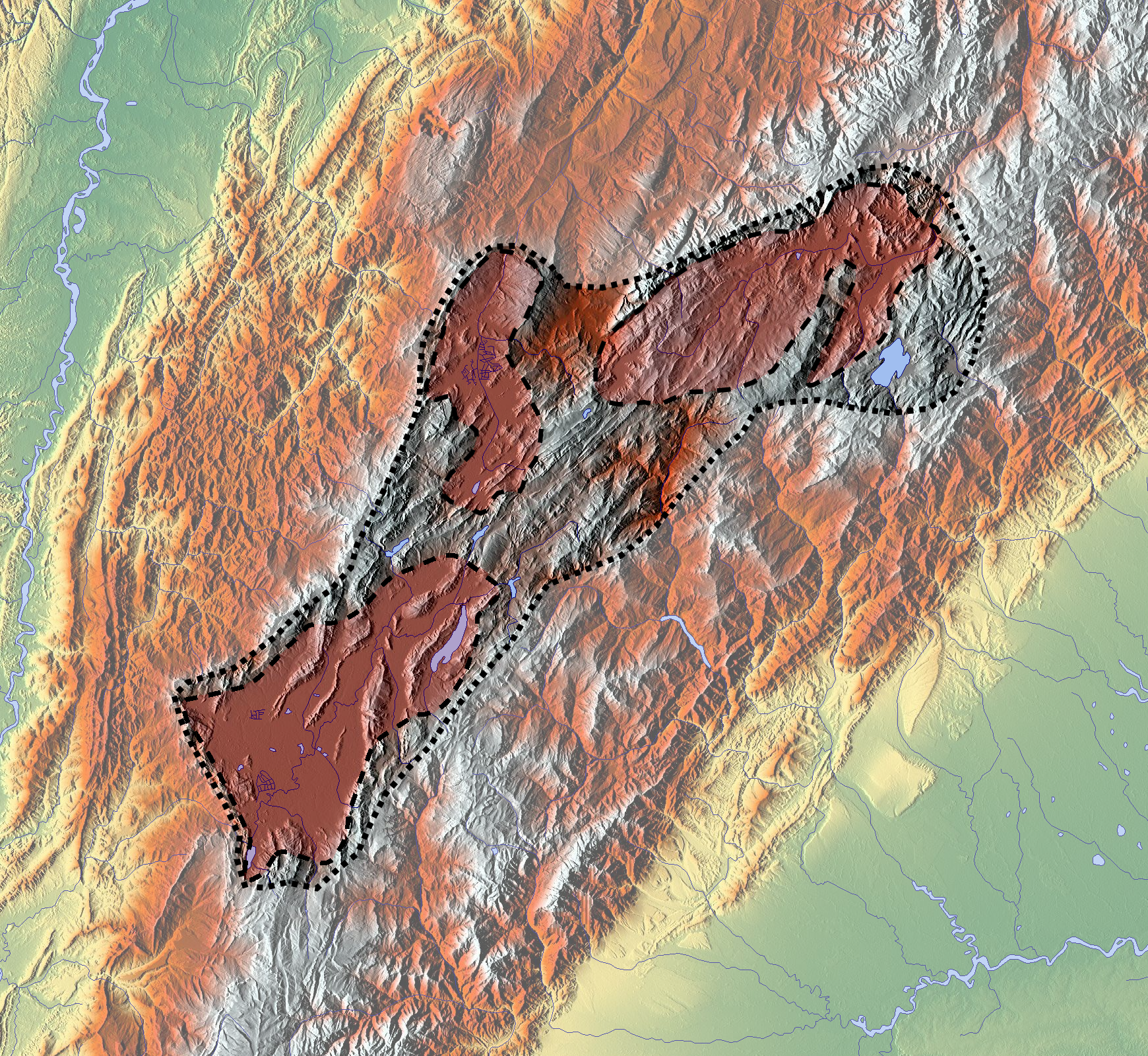
Type locality of the Ritoque Formation on the Altiplano Cundiboyacense

The Ritoque Formation is found, apart from its type locality near Villa de Leyva, Boyacá, found in the vicinity.

== See also ==
Geology of the Eastern Hills
Geology of the Ocetá Páramo
Geology of the Altiplano Cundiboyacense
