= La Palma, Cundinamarca =

La Palma
- Municipality and town
- Flag Coat of arms

- Location of the municipality and town inside Cundinamarca Department of Colombia

- Location in Colombia
- Coordinates: 5°21′38″N 74°23′23″W
- Country: Colombia
- Department: Cundinamarca

Government
  - Alcalde: Virgilio Alfonso Galindo Obando
- Elevation: 1,462 m (4,797 ft)

Population (Census 2018)
  - Metro: 7,708
- Time zone: UTC-5 (Colombia Standard Time)

La Palma is a municipality and town in the department of Cundinamarca, Colombia.

== Climate ==
Climate data for Yacopí (Note: Yacopí is located approximately 12 kilometres (7.5 mi) north of La Palma.), elevation 1,347 m (4,419 ft), (1981–2010)
Month	Jan	Feb	Mar	Apr	May	Jun	Jul	Aug	Sep	Oct	Nov	Dec	Year
Mean daily maximum °C (°F)	24.5 (76.1)	24.8 (76.6)	24.7 (76.5)	25.0 (77.0)	25.2 (77.4)	25.4 (77.7)	25.7 (78.3)	26.2 (79.2)	25.7 (78.3)	25.0 (77.0)	24.5 (76.1)	24.5 (76.1)	25.1 (77.2)
Daily mean °C (°F)	20.8 (69.4)	21.1 (70.0)	21.1 (70.0)	21.1 (70.0)	21.4 (70.5)	21.6 (70.9)	21.6 (70.9)	21.8 (71.2)	21.4 (70.5)	20.9 (69.6)	20.8 (69.4)	20.8 (69.4)	21.2 (70.2)
Mean daily minimum °C (°F)	17.1 (62.8)	17.2 (63.0)	17.3 (63.1)	17.5 (63.5)	17.5 (63.5)	17.6 (63.7)	17.4 (63.3)	17.6 (63.7)	17.3 (63.1)	17.1 (62.8)	17.3 (63.1)	17.4 (63.3)	17.4 (63.3)
Average precipitation mm (inches)	103.5 (4.07)	155.3 (6.11)	223.5 (8.80)	342.9 (13.50)	326.0 (12.83)	216.9 (8.54)	162.8 (6.41)	165.6 (6.52)	257.5 (10.14)	342.2 (13.47)	266.7 (10.50)	156.7 (6.17)	2,719.4 (107.06)
Average precipitation days	14	15	20	24	24	19	16	15	21	25	22	17	225
Average relative humidity (%)	89	88	88	89	89	86	82	83	86	89	90	90	88
Mean monthly sunshine hours	151.9	118.6	108.5	105.0	130.2	156.0	192.2	170.5	138.0	133.3	135.0	142.6	1,681.8
Mean daily sunshine hours	4.9	4.2	3.5	3.5	4.2	5.2	6.2	5.5	4.6	4.3	4.5	4.6	4.6
Source: Instituto de Hidrologia Meteorologia y Estudios Ambientales
