= Sáchica =

- Municipality and town
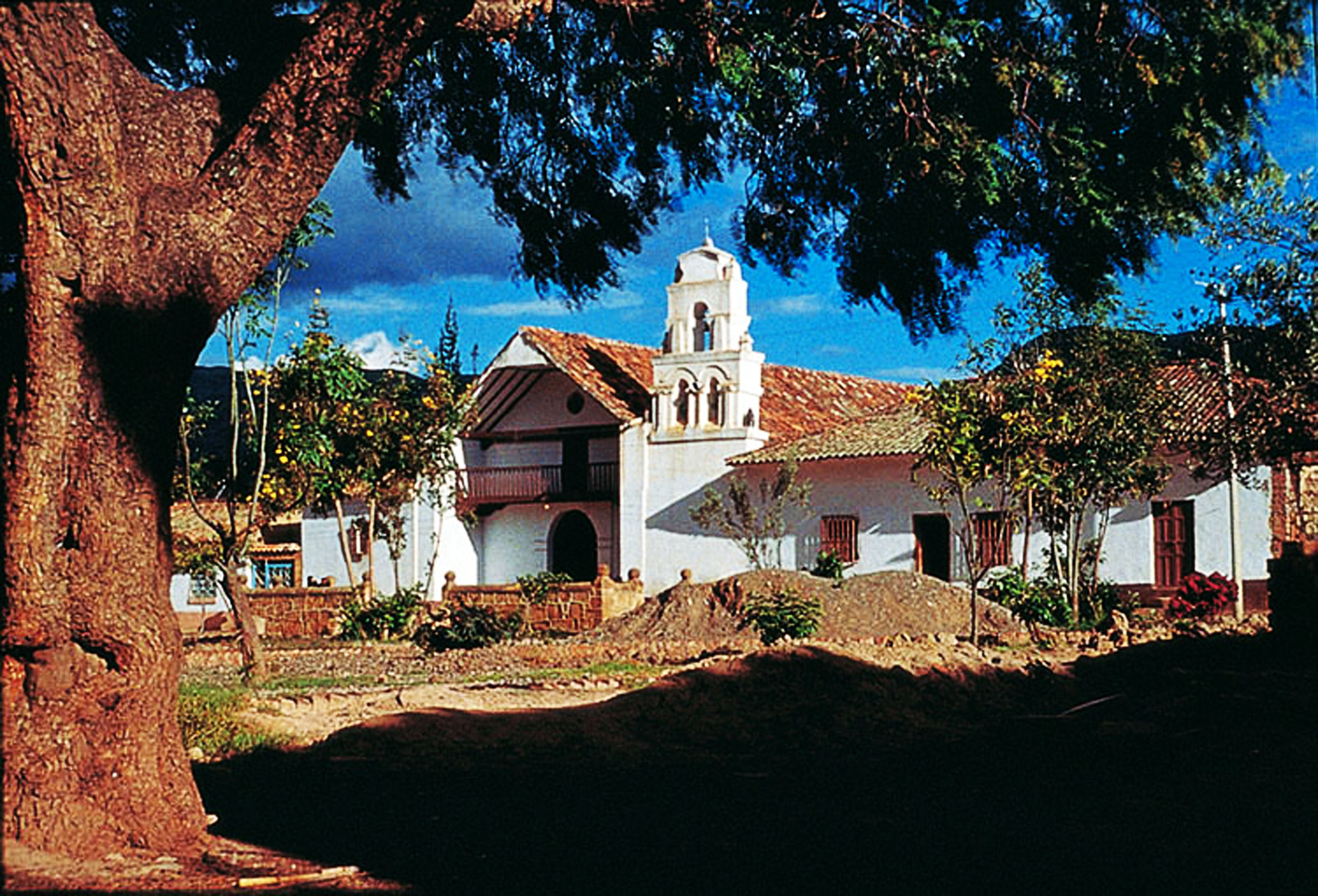
- Church of Sáchica

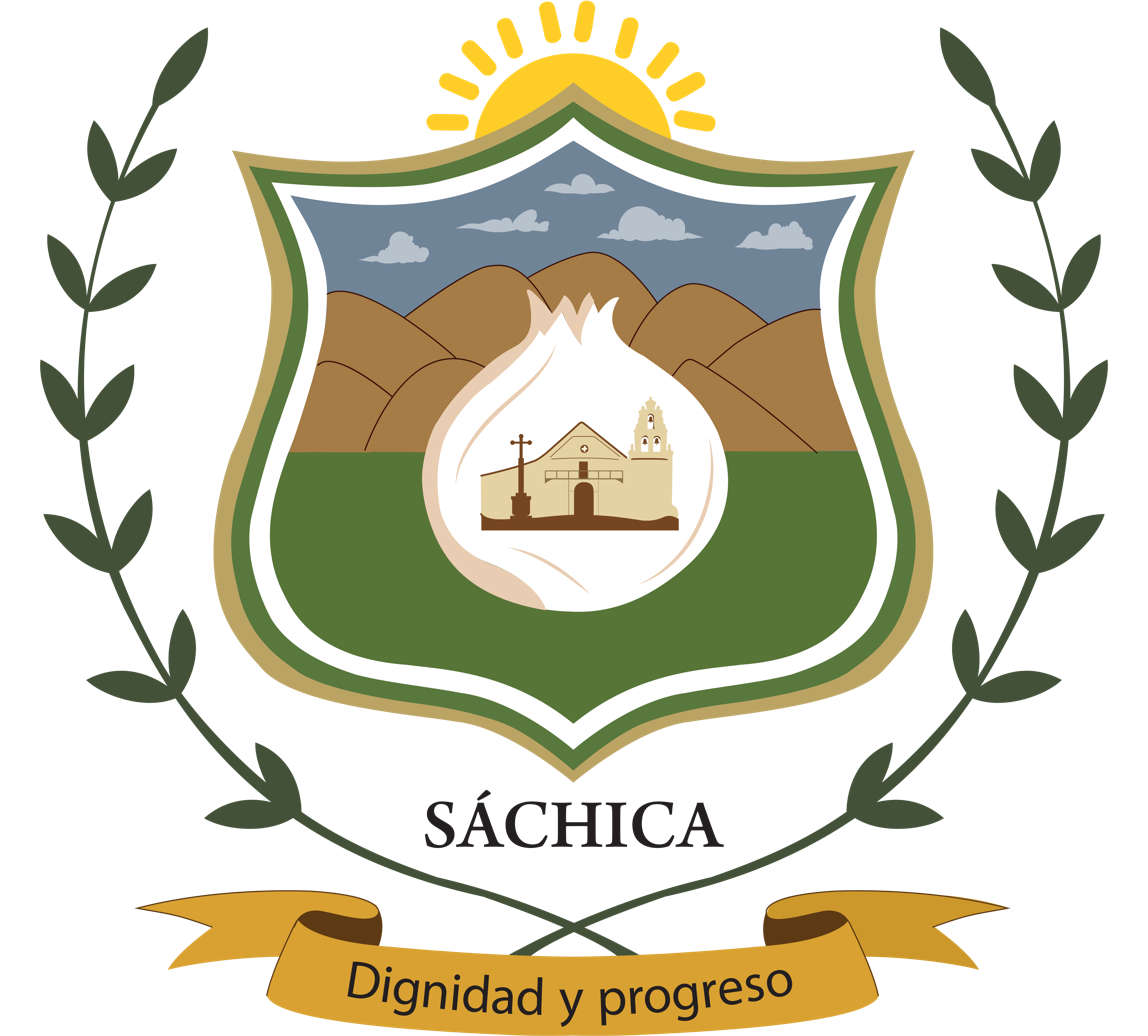
- Flag Coat of arms
- Nickname: City of onions
- Location of the municipality and town of Sáchica in the Boyacá Department of Colombia
- Coordinates: 5°35′N 73°33′W
- Country: Colombia
- Department: Boyacá Department
- Province: Ricaurte Province
- Founded: 16 July 1556
- Founder: Juan Velasco and Carlos Rojas

Government
  - Mayor: Hugo Buitrago (2020-2023)

Area
  - Municipality and town: 62.4 km^{2} (24.1 sq mi)
- Elevation: 2,150 m (7,050 ft)

Population (2015)
  - Municipality and town: 3,791
  - Density: 60.8/km^{2} (157/sq mi)
  - Urban: 1,875
- Time zone: UTC-5 (Colombia Standard Time)
- Website: www.sachica-boyaca.gov.co

Sáchica is a municipality of Colombia situated approximately 34 km (21 mi) west of Tunja in the Ricaurte Province of the department of Boyacá. Sáchica borders Sutamarchán and Villa de Leyva in the north, in the east Chíquiza, Samacá and Ráquira in the south and in the west Ráquira and Sutamarchán.

== History ==
In the centuries before the arrival of the Spanish conquistadores, Sáchica was ruled by a cacique loyal to the zaque of Hunza. Evidence of long inhabitation has been found in the form of petroglyphs made by the Muisca who were organized in the Muisca Confederation. The Muisca had their own religion where their main gods were Sué (the Sun) and Chía; the Moon. In Sáchica monuments to both celestial bodies have been constructed.

Modern Sáchica was founded on July 16, 1556, by Juan Velasco and Carlos Rojas. In 1574 a total of 2500 indigenous people were living in Sáchica, presently only 5% is indigenous, the remainder mestizo.

In the Chibcha language of the Muisca, Sáchica means "our present domain", "fortress" or "mansion of the sovereign".

=== Rock art ===
In a rock shelter in Sáchica, rock art in the form of pictographs has been discovered. The archaeologist Eliécer Silva Celis pioneered in the study of them in the 1960s. Later research has been performed by Carl Henrik Langebaek, Diego Martínez, Álvaro Botiva, Pedro Argüello García, and others. The black, red and white rock art is present at an altitude of 2,210 m (7,250 ft) at 5°35′29.058″N 73°31′15.926″W and shows human faces, Suns, maize, eyes, mountains, masks, and other figures. The rock art has been produced in rock shelters of Lower Cretaceous formations.

== Paleontology ==
Fossilized skeleton of pliosaurid Sachicasaurus vitae almost 10 m long was found in the Lower Cretaceous (Barremian) deposits near Sáchica. The generic name of this animal refers to Sáchica while the species epithet is meaning "life" in reference to "the vitality that this fossil has given to the Sáchica village since its discovery". Despite its large size, the found individual of Sachicasaurus is not an adult.

The ichthyosaur Platypterygius sachicarum (now Kyhytysuka sachicarum), found in the Paja Formation of Villa de Leyva, has also been named after Sáchica.

== Economy ==
Sachiquense economy is based on religious tourism, agriculture; onions and tomatoes, and mining; gypsum, marble and clay.

== Gallery ==
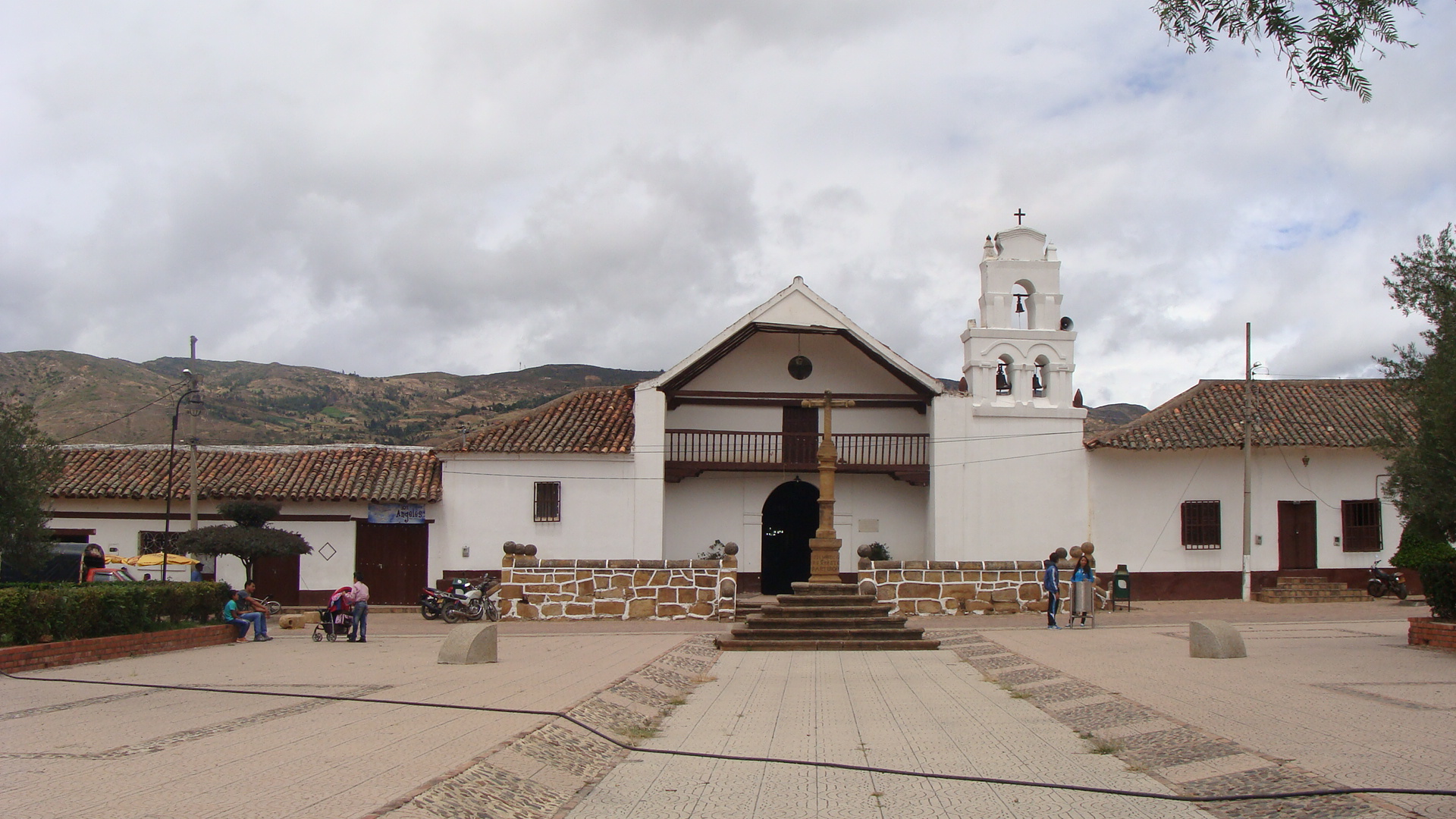
Central square and church

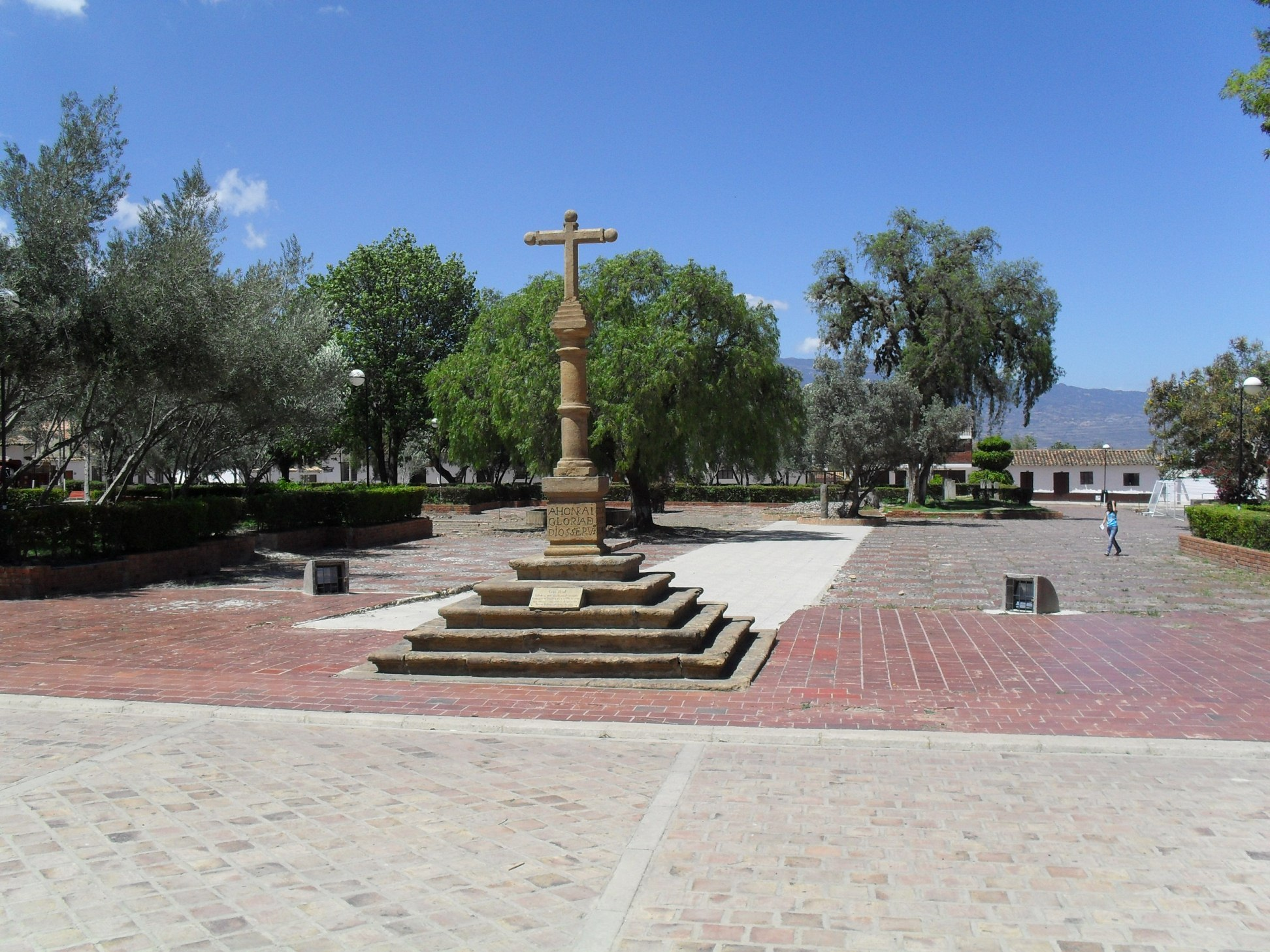
Central square

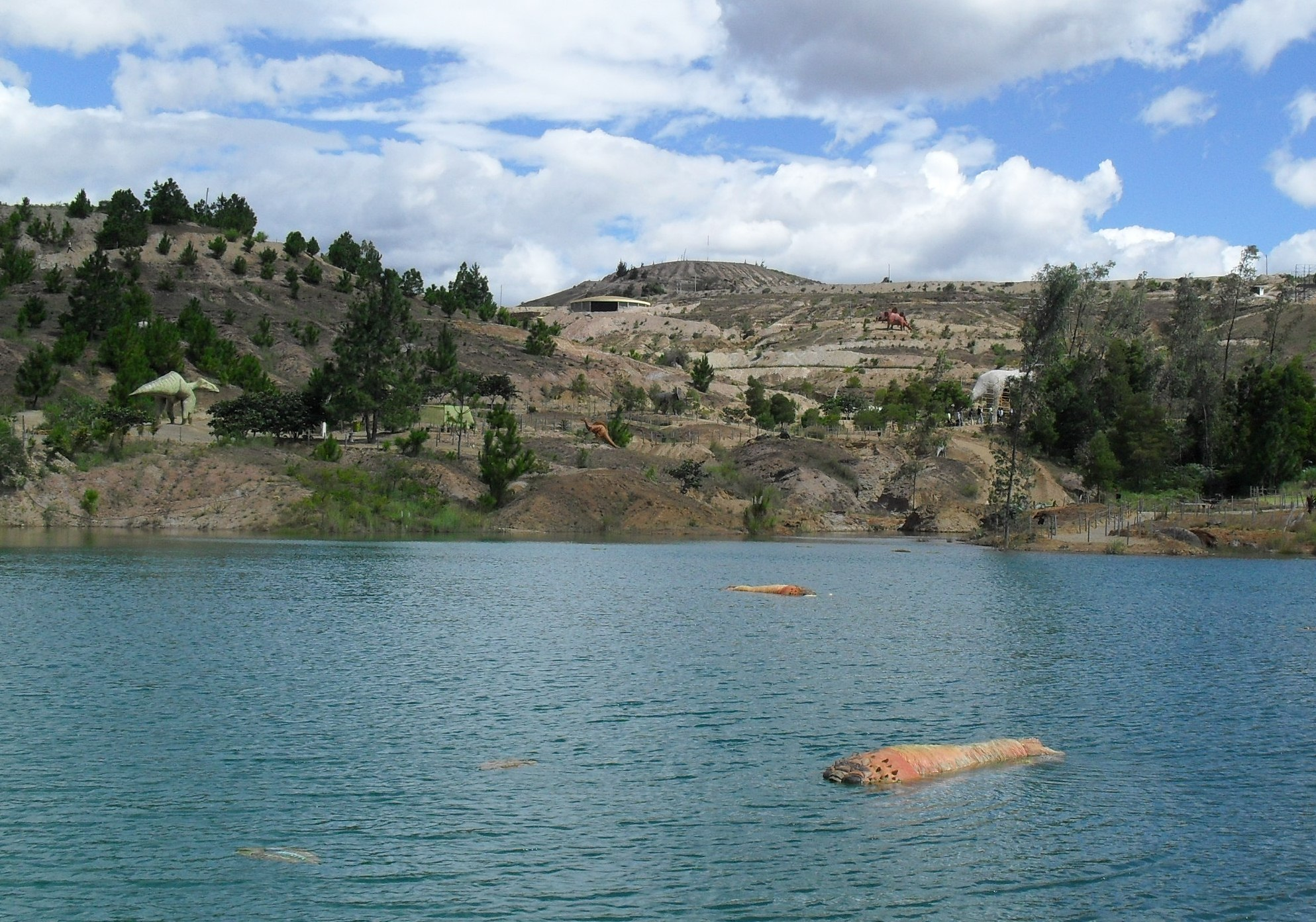
Gondava Lake

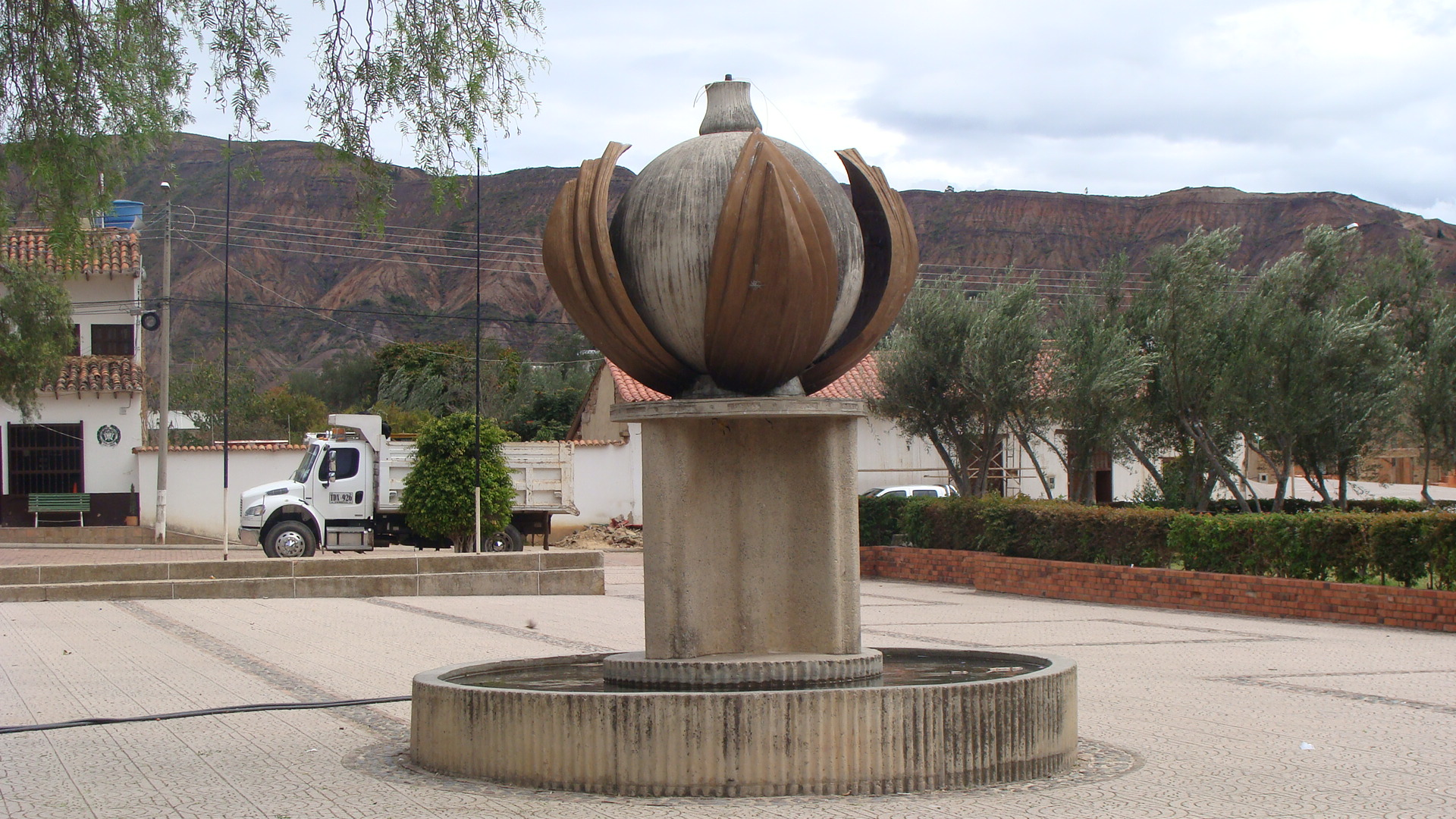
Monument to the Sun

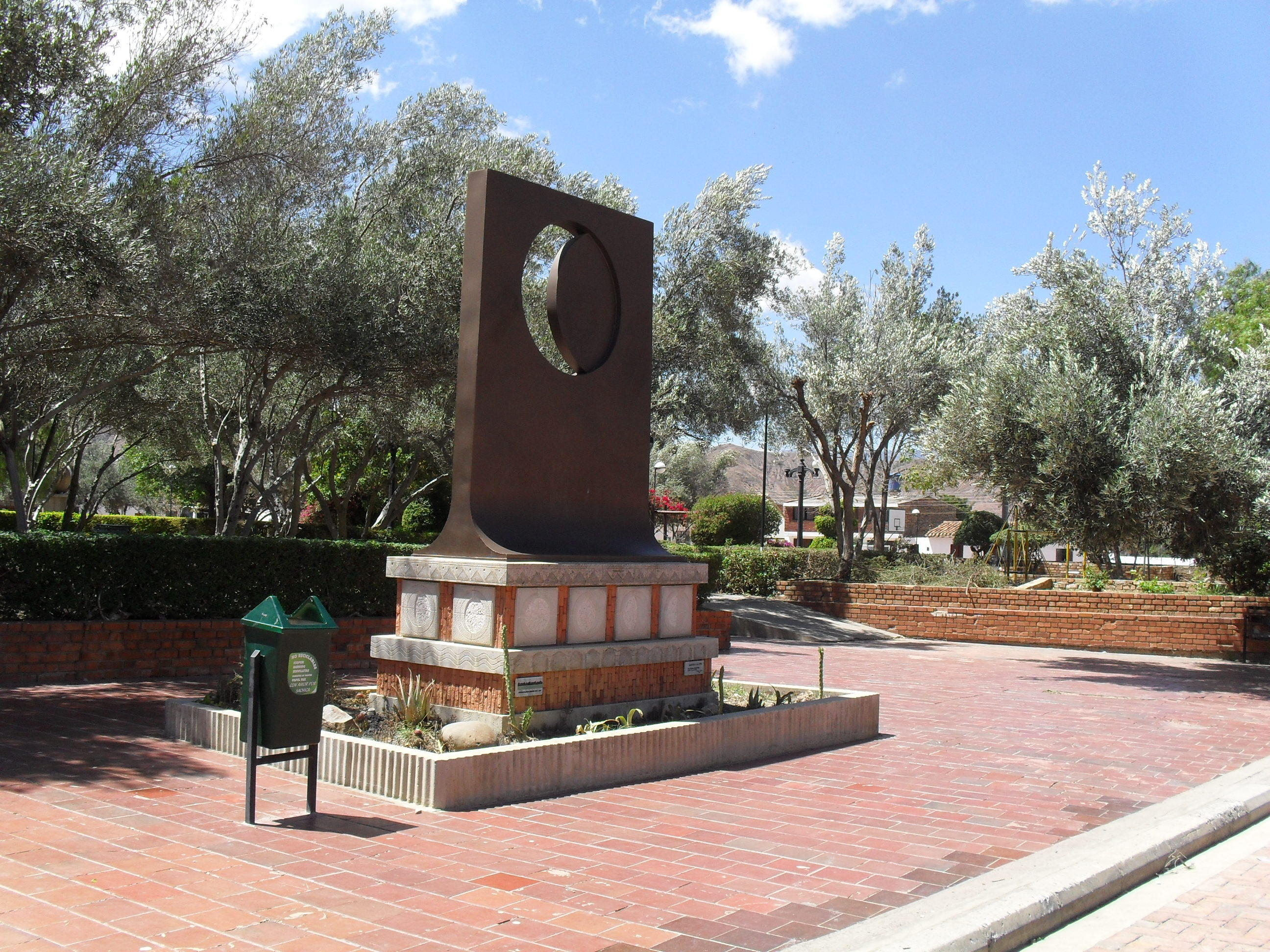
Monument to the Moon
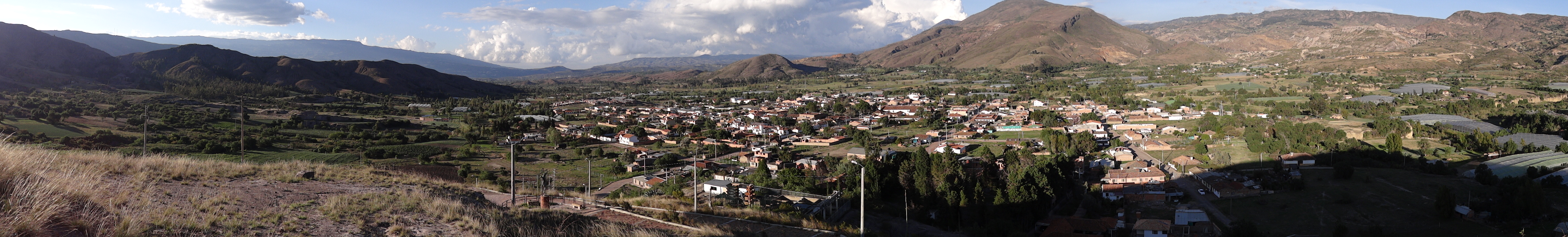
Panorama of Sáchica
