= Teorama =

Coordinates: 8°26′N 72°17′W

- Municipality and town
- Flag

- Location of the municipality and town of Teorama in the Norte de Santander Department of Colombia.
- Country: Colombia
- Department: Norte de Santander Department

Area
  - Municipality and town: 852 km^{2} (329 sq mi)
- Elevation: 72 m (236 ft)

Population (2015)
  - Municipality and town: 21,524
  - Density: 25.3/km^{2} (65.4/sq mi)
  - Urban: 2,702
- Time zone: UTC-5 (Colombia Standard Time)

Teorama is a Colombian municipality located in the department of North Santander.

== Climate ==
Climate data for Teorama, elevation 1,160 m (3,810 ft), (1981–2010)
Month	Jan	Feb	Mar	Apr	May	Jun	Jul	Aug	Sep	Oct	Nov	Dec	Year
Mean daily maximum °C (°F)	24.2 (75.6)	24.7 (76.5)	25.5 (77.9)	25.5 (77.9)	26.0 (78.8)	26.1 (79.0)	26.1 (79.0)	26.5 (79.7)	26.2 (79.2)	25.8 (78.4)	25.1 (77.2)	24.3 (75.7)	25.5 (77.9)
Daily mean °C (°F)	20.4 (68.7)	21.0 (69.8)	21.5 (70.7)	21.8 (71.2)	22.3 (72.1)	22.4 (72.3)	22.2 (72.0)	22.5 (72.5)	22.4 (72.3)	22.0 (71.6)	21.4 (70.5)	20.7 (69.3)	21.7 (71.1)
Mean daily minimum °C (°F)	17.3 (63.1)	17.7 (63.9)	18.1 (64.6)	18.8 (65.8)	19.0 (66.2)	18.7 (65.7)	18.2 (64.8)	18.3 (64.9)	18.4 (65.1)	18.5 (65.3)	18.5 (65.3)	18.1 (64.6)	18.3 (64.9)
Average precipitation mm (inches)	37.0 (1.46)	36.4 (1.43)	51.1 (2.01)	118.2 (4.65)	139.5 (5.49)	90.7 (3.57)	110.4 (4.35)	147.9 (5.82)	184.6 (7.27)	201.7 (7.94)	135.6 (5.34)	87.4 (3.44)	1,332.9 (52.48)
Average precipitation days	8	7	8	14	15	12	14	17	19	19	16	13	164
Average relative humidity (%)	88	87	86	88	87	86	85	84	86	87	89	90	87
Source: Instituto de Hidrologia Meteorologia y Estudios Ambientales
