= Toledo, Norte de Santander =

Coordinates: 7.31306°N 72.4875°W

- Municipality and town
- Flag

- Location of the municipality and town of Toledo, Norte de Santander in the Norte de Santander Department of Colombia.
- Country: Colombia
- Department: Norte de Santander Department

Area
  - Municipality and town: 1,578 km^{2} (609 sq mi)
- Elevation: 1,642 m (5,387 ft)

Population (2015)
  - Municipality and town: 17,283
  - Urban: 4,470
- Time zone: UTC-5 (Colombia Standard Time)

Toledo (Spanish pronunciation: [toˈleðo]) is a Colombian municipality and town located in the department of North Santander. It is on the border with Boyacá Department and has natural gas development in the township of Gibraltar. In August 2011 the Gibraltar to Bucaramanga gas pipeline was completed.

== Townships (corregimientos) ==
- Gibraltar
- Samoré
- San Bernardo

== Climate ==
Toledo has a very wet subtropical highland climate (Cfb). It has heavy rainfall from November to February and very heavy to extremely heavy rainfall from April to October.

Climate data for Toledo
Month	Jan	Feb	Mar	Apr	May	Jun	Jul	Aug	Sep	Oct	Nov	Dec	Year
Mean daily maximum °C (°F)	22.4 (72.3)	22.9 (73.2)	23.2 (73.8)	22.9 (73.2)	23.1 (73.6)	22.7 (72.9)	22.5 (72.5)	23.0 (73.4)	23.4 (74.1)	23.0 (73.4)	22.7 (72.9)	22.3 (72.1)	22.8 (73.1)
Daily mean °C (°F)	17.3 (63.1)	17.8 (64.0)	18.3 (64.9)	18.4 (65.1)	18.5 (65.3)	18.2 (64.8)	18.0 (64.4)	18.2 (64.8)	18.5 (65.3)	18.2 (64.8)	18.0 (64.4)	17.6 (63.7)	18.1 (64.6)
Mean daily minimum °C (°F)	12.3 (54.1)	12.7 (54.9)	13.5 (56.3)	14.0 (57.2)	14.0 (57.2)	13.7 (56.7)	13.5 (56.3)	13.5 (56.3)	13.6 (56.5)	13.5 (56.3)	13.4 (56.1)	12.9 (55.2)	13.4 (56.1)
Average rainfall mm (inches)	192.9 (7.59)	290.2 (11.43)	348.4 (13.72)	460.1 (18.11)	590.2 (23.24)	873.8 (34.40)	721.4 (28.40)	595.7 (23.45)	502.4 (19.78)	355.3 (13.99)	264.3 (10.41)	201.4 (7.93)	5,396.1 (212.45)
Average rainy days	12	15	18	23	24	27	27	25	22	21	17	15	246
Source 1:
Source 2:
