= Villeta, Cundinamarca =

Villeta
- Municipality and town
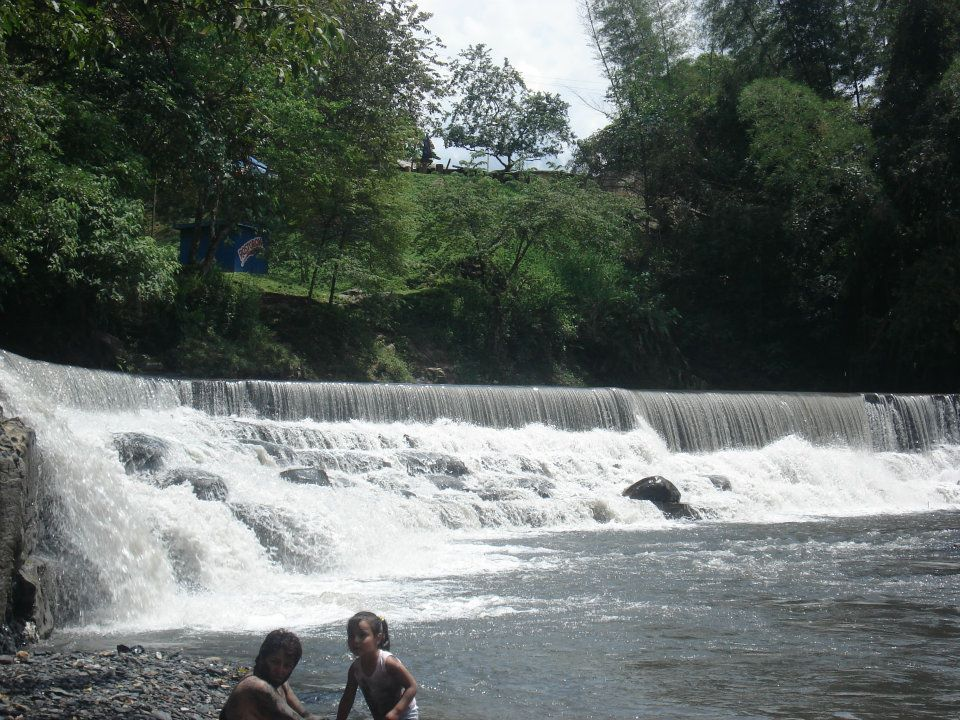
- Bocatoma waterfall in Villeta

- Flag Coat of arms

- Location of Villeta in Cundinamarca

- Location in Colombia
- Coordinates: 5°0′29.91″N 74°28′25.61″W
- Country: Colombia
- Department: Cundinamarca
- Province: Gualivá
- Founded: 29 September 1551
- Founder: Alonso de Olalla & Hernando de Alcocer

Government
  - Mayor: Jhon Alexander Morera Gutiérrez (2016-2019)

Area
  - Municipality and town: 140.9 km^{2} (54.4 sq mi)
  - Urban: 5.5 km^{2} (2.1 sq mi)
- Elevation: 850 m (2,790 ft)

Population (2018 census)
  - Municipality and town: 26,873
  - Density: 190.7/km^{2} (494.0/sq mi)
  - Urban: 17,985
  - Urban density: 3,300/km^{2} (8,500/sq mi)
- Time zone: UTC-5 (Colombia Standard Time)
- Website: Official website

Villeta is a municipality and town in Cundinamarca Department, Colombia. It is located in Gualivá Province, approximately 84 kilometres (52 mi) northwest of Bogotá, considered the capital of the province. Its name means 'little village'. The municipality borders Quebradanegra and Nimaima in the north, Nocaima and Sasaima in the east, Albán and Vianí in the south and Guaduas in the west. It is situated at an altitude of 850 metres (2,790 ft) in the Eastern Ranges of the Colombian Andes

== History ==
The region of Villeta before the Spanish conquest was inhabited by the Panche. Modern Villeta was founded as Villa de San Miguel on September 29, 1551, by Alonso de Olalla and Hernando de Alcocer.

Main economic activities in Villeta are related with sugar cane derivatives and as an important tourist center for people from Bogotá due to its warm climate, including ecologic trails, cascades and hotels.

== Geology ==
The Villeta Group comprising the Conejo, La Frontera, Simijaca, Hiló, Capotes, Socotá, El Peñón and Trincheras Formations is named after Villeta.

== Gallery ==
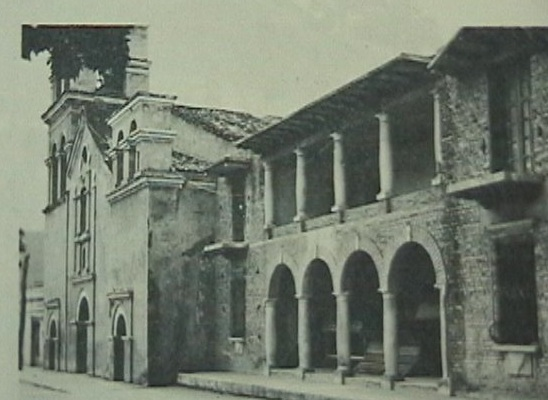
Old house

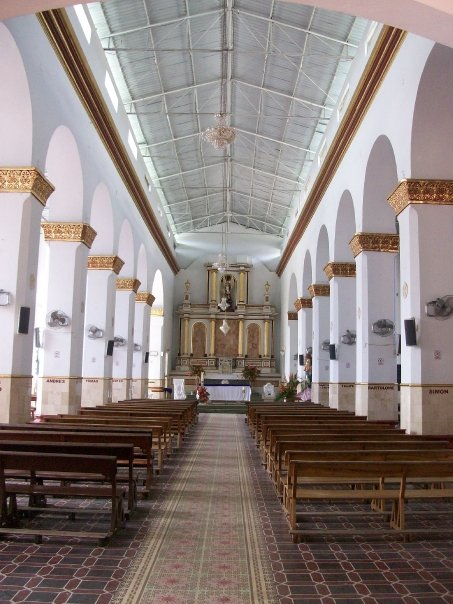
Church interior

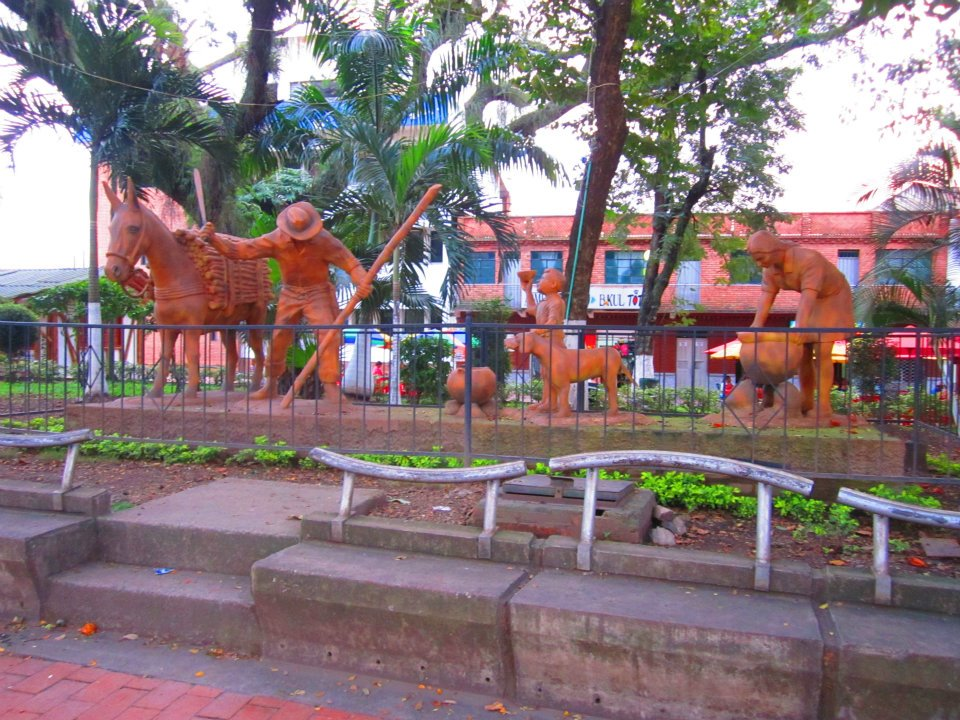
Monument to the farmers

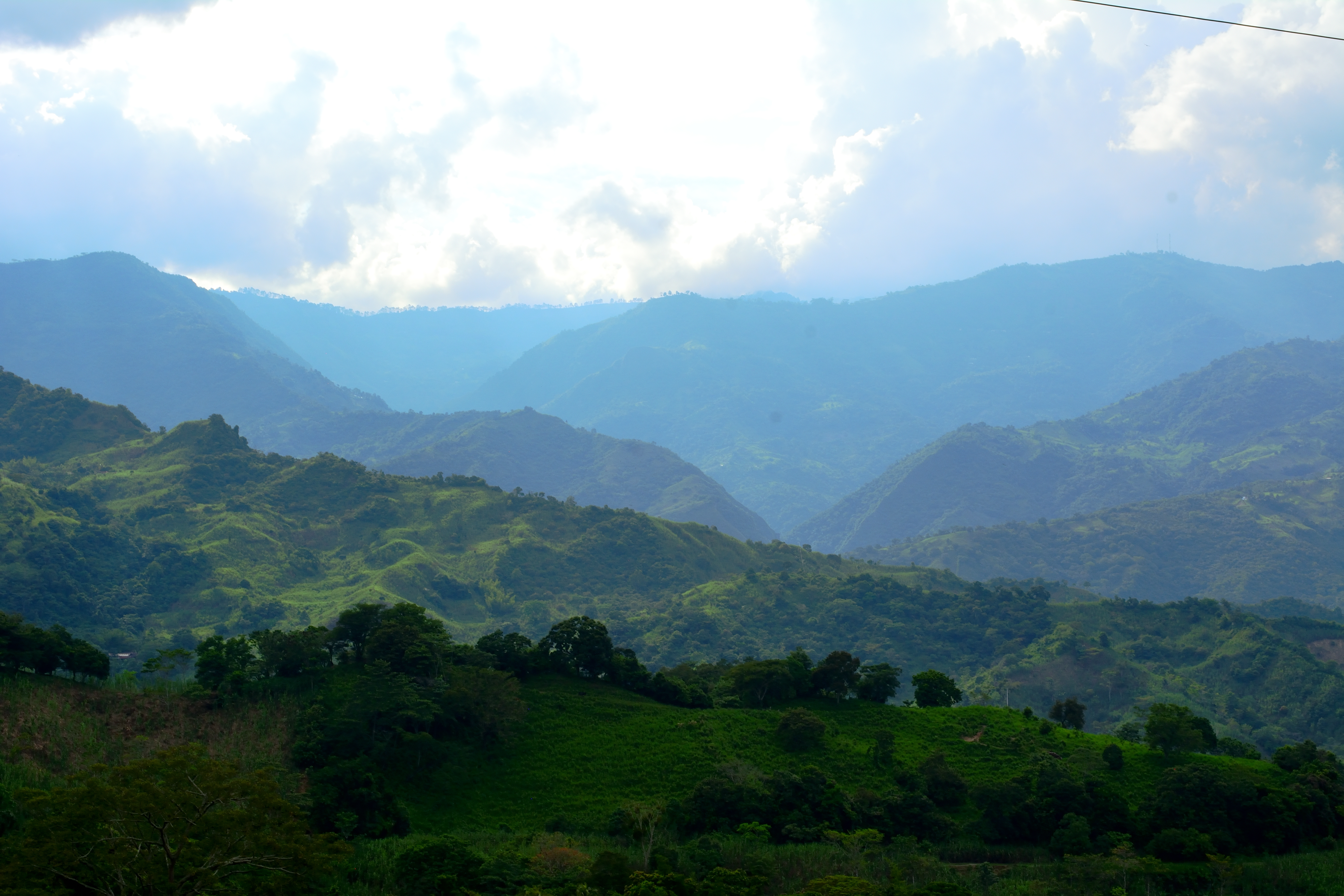
Landscape of Villeta
