= Caballos Formation =

Geological formation in Colombia

- Stratigraphic range: Aptian-Albian; ~120–100 Ma
- Type: Geological formation
- Underlies: Hondita Formation
- Overlies: Yaví & Saldaña Formations
- Thickness: up to 411 m (1,348 ft)

Lithology
- Primary: Sandstone, shale, siltstone
- Other: Limestone, coal

Location
- Coordinates: 3°49′18.9″N 75°21′22.4″W
- Region: Caquetá, Huila, Putumayo & Tolima Departments
- Country: Colombia
- Extent: VSM & Caguán-Putumayo Basin; Central & Eastern Ranges, Andes

Type section
- Named for: Cerro Caballos
- Named by: Corrigan
- Location: Olaya Herrera
- Year defined: 1967
- Coordinates: 3°49′18.9″N 75°21′22.4″W
- Approximate paleocoordinates: 2.9°S 47.4°W
- Region: Tolima
- Country: Colombia
- Thickness at type section: 411 m (1,348 ft)
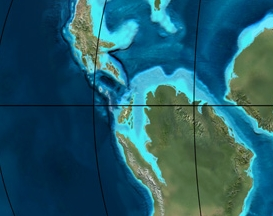
- Paleogeography of Northern South America; 105 Ma, by Ron Blakey

The Caballos Formation (Spanish: Formación Caballos, KI) is a geological formation of the Upper Magdalena Valley (VSM), Caguán-Putumayo Basin, Central and Eastern Ranges of the Colombian Andes. The sandstone and shale formation dates to the Middle Cretaceous period; Aptian to Albian epochs and has a maximum thickness of 411 metres (1,348 ft).

== Etymology ==
The formation was defined and named in 1967 by Corrigan after Cerro Caballos, to the west of Olaya Herrera, Tolima.

== Description ==
=== Lithologies ===
The Caballos Formation has a maximum thickness of 411 metres (1,348 ft) in the Quebrada Bambucá and is characterized by a lower sequence of fine to coarse sandstones, of lithic arenite, quartz arenite and feldspar arenite composition, a middle section of fossiliferous black shales and siltstones, intercalated by micritic limestones and coals and very fine sandstones. The upper part of the formation contains conglomerates and glauconitic sandstones.

=== Stratigraphy and depositional environment ===
The Caballos Formation in some parts concordantly overlies the Yaví Formation and in other parts rests unconformably on the Saldaña Formation and Ibagué Batholith. The formation is overlain by the Hondita Formation. The age has been estimated to be Aptian to Albian. Stratigraphically, the formation is time equivalent with the Une, Aguardiente, Simijaca, El Peñón, Capotes, Tablazo, Tibú-Mercedes and Pacho Formations. The formation has been deposited in a fluvial to estuarine and shallow marine environment.

The Caballos Formation is a source, reservoir and seal rock in the Upper Magdalena Valley, and a source and reservoir rock in the Caguán-Putumayo Basin. The Orito and Moqueta Fields of the latter basin produce from Caballos reservoirs.

=== Fossil content ===
The formation has provided fossils of Heminautilus etheringtoni, Araucarites sp., Brachyphyllum sp., Cladophlebis sp., and Weichselia sp., as well as many types of pollen.

== Outcrops ==
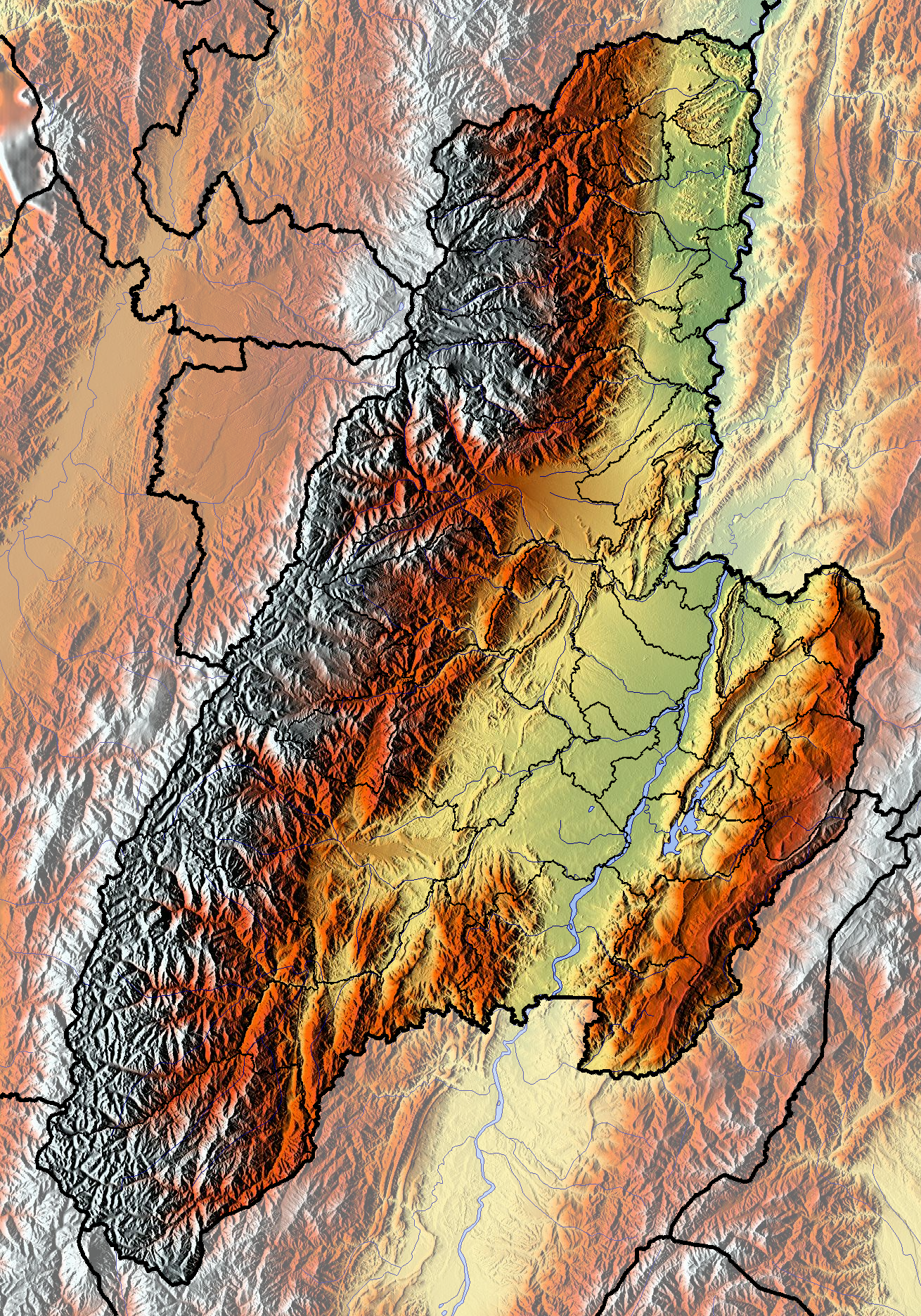
Type locality of the Caballos Formation in Tolima

The Caballos Formation is apart from its type locality, found in Huila, Tolima and Putumayo Departments.

== Regional correlations ==
Stratigraphy of the Llanos Basin and surrounding provinces
Ma	Age	Paleomap	Regional events	Catatumbo	Cordillera	proximal Llanos	distal Llanos	Putumayo	VSM	Environments	Maximum thickness	Petroleum geology	Notes
0.01	Holocene		Holocene volcanism Seismic activity	alluvium								Overburden	
1	Pleistocene		Pleistocene volcanism Andean orogeny 3 Glaciations	Guayabo	Soatá; Sabana	Necesidad	Guayabo	Gigante Neiva		Alluvial to fluvial (Guayabo)	550 m (1,800 ft) (Guayabo)	Overburden	
2.6	Pliocene		Pliocene volcanism Andean orogeny 3 GABI	Guayabo	Subachoque	Necesidad	Guayabo	Gigante Neiva		Alluvial to fluvial (Guayabo)	550 m (1,800 ft) (Guayabo)	Overburden	
5.3	Messinian		Andean orogeny 3 Foreland	Guayabo	Marichuela	Necesidad	Guayabo	Caimán	Honda	Alluvial to fluvial (Guayabo)	550 m (1,800 ft) (Guayabo)	Overburden	
13.5	Langhian		Regional flooding	León	hiatus	Caja	León	Caimán	Honda	Lacustrine (León)	400 m (1,300 ft) (León)	Seal	
16.2	Burdigalian		Miocene inundations Andean orogeny 2	C1	hiatus	Carbonera C1		Ospina	Honda	Proximal fluvio-deltaic (C1)	850 m (2,790 ft) (Carbonera)	Reservoir	
17.3	Burdigalian		Miocene inundations Andean orogeny 2	C2	hiatus	Carbonera C2		Ospina	Honda	Distal lacustrine-deltaic (C2)	850 m (2,790 ft) (Carbonera)	Seal	
19	Burdigalian		Miocene inundations Andean orogeny 2	C3	hiatus	Carbonera C3		Ospina	Honda	Proximal fluvio-deltaic (C3)	850 m (2,790 ft) (Carbonera)	Reservoir	
21	Early Miocene		Pebas wetlands	C4	hiatus	Carbonera C4		Ospina	Barzalosa	Distal fluvio-deltaic (C4)	850 m (2,790 ft) (Carbonera)	Seal	
23	Late Oligocene		Andean orogeny 1 Foredeep	C5	hiatus	Carbonera C5		Orito		Proximal fluvio-deltaic (C5)	850 m (2,790 ft) (Carbonera)	Reservoir	
25	Late Oligocene		Andean orogeny 1 Foredeep	C6	hiatus	Carbonera C6		Orito		Distal fluvio-lacustrine (C6)	850 m (2,790 ft) (Carbonera)	Seal	
28	Early Oligocene		Andean orogeny 1 Foredeep	C7	hiatus	C7		Pepino	Gualanday	Proximal deltaic-marine (C7)	850 m (2,790 ft) (Carbonera)	Reservoir	
32	Oligo-Eocene		Andean orogeny 1 Foredeep	C8	Usme	C8	onlap	Pepino	Gualanday	Marine-deltaic (C8)	850 m (2,790 ft) (Carbonera)	Seal; Source	
35	Late Eocene		Andean orogeny 1 Foredeep	Mirador	Usme	Mirador		Pepino	Gualanday	Coastal (Mirador)	240 m (790 ft) (Mirador)	Reservoir	
40	Middle Eocene		Andean orogeny 1 Foredeep	Mirador	Regadera	Mirador		Pepino	hiatus	Coastal (Mirador)	240 m (790 ft) (Mirador)	Reservoir	
45	Middle Eocene		Andean orogeny 1 Foredeep	Mirador	Regadera	Mirador		Pepino	hiatus	Coastal (Mirador)	240 m (790 ft) (Mirador)	Reservoir	
50	Early Eocene		Andean orogeny 1 Foredeep	Socha	Regadera	Los Cuervos		Pepino	hiatus	Deltaic (Los Cuervos)	260 m (850 ft) (Los Cuervos)	Seal; Source	
55	Late Paleocene		PETM; 2000 ppm CO_{2}	Los Cuervos	Bogotá	Los Cuervos		Pepino	Gualanday	Deltaic (Los Cuervos)	260 m (850 ft) (Los Cuervos)	Seal; Source	
60	Early Paleocene		SALMA	Barco	Guaduas	Barco		Rumiyaco	Gualanday	Fluvial (Barco)	225 m (738 ft) (Barco)	Reservoir	
65	Maastrichtian		KT extinction	Catatumbo	Guadalupe			Rumiyaco	Monserrate	Deltaic-fluvial (Guadalupe)	750 m (2,460 ft) (Guadalupe)	Reservoir	
72	Campanian		End of rifting	Colón-Mito Juan	Guadalupe			Rumiyaco	Monserrate	Deltaic-fluvial (Guadalupe)	750 m (2,460 ft) (Guadalupe)	Reservoir	
83	Santonian		End of rifting	Colón-Mito Juan	Guadalupe			Villeta/Güagüaquí		Deltaic-fluvial (Guadalupe)	750 m (2,460 ft) (Guadalupe)	Reservoir	
86	Coniacian		End of rifting	Colón-Mito Juan	Guadalupe			Villeta/Güagüaquí		Deltaic-fluvial (Guadalupe)	750 m (2,460 ft) (Guadalupe)	Reservoir	
89	Turonian		Cenomanian-Turonian anoxic event	La Luna	Chipaque	Gachetá	hiatus	Villeta/Güagüaquí		Restricted marine (all)	500 m (1,600 ft) (Gachetá)	Source	
93	Cenomanian		Rift 2	La Luna	Chipaque	Gachetá	hiatus	Villeta/Güagüaquí		Restricted marine (all)	500 m (1,600 ft) (Gachetá)	Source	
100	Albian		Rift 2	La Luna	Une	Une	hiatus	Caballos		Deltaic (Une)	500 m (1,600 ft) (Une)	Reservoir	
113	Aptian		Rift 2	Capacho	Fómeque	Une	hiatus	Motema	Yaví	Open marine (Fómeque)	800 m (2,600 ft) (Fómeque)	Source (Fóm)	
125	Barremian		High biodiversity	Aguardiente	Paja	Une	hiatus	Motema	Yaví	Shallow to open marine (Paja)	940 m (3,080 ft) (Paja)	Reservoir	
129	Hauterivian		Rift 1	Tibú- Mercedes	Las Juntas	hiatus	hiatus	Motema	Yaví	Deltaic (Las Juntas)	910 m (2,990 ft) (Las Juntas)	Reservoir (LJun)	
133	Valanginian		Rift 1	Río Negro	Cáqueza; Macanal; Rosablanca	hiatus	hiatus	Motema	Yaví	Restricted marine (Macanal)	2,935 m (9,629 ft) (Macanal)	Source (Mac)	
140	Berriasian		Rift 1	Girón	Cáqueza; Macanal; Rosablanca	hiatus	hiatus	Motema	Yaví	Restricted marine (Macanal)	2,935 m (9,629 ft) (Macanal)	Source (Mac)	
145	Tithonian		Break-up of Pangea	Jordán	Arcabuco	Buenavista Batá	hiatus	Saldaña		Alluvial, fluvial (Buenavista)	110 m (360 ft) (Buenavista)	"Jurassic"	
150	Early-Mid Jurassic		Passive margin 2	La Quinta	Montebel Noreán	hiatus	hiatus	Saldaña		Coastal tuff (La Quinta)	100 m (330 ft) (La Quinta)	"Jurassic"	
201	Late Triassic		Passive margin 2	Mucuchachi	Montebel Noreán	hiatus	hiatus	Payandé				"Jurassic"	
235	Early Triassic		Pangea		hiatus	hiatus	hiatus					"Paleozoic"	
250	Permian		Pangea		hiatus	hiatus	hiatus					"Paleozoic"	
300	Late Carboniferous		Famatinian orogeny		hiatus	hiatus	hiatus		Cerro Neiva ()			"Paleozoic"	
340	Early Carboniferous		Fossil fish Romer's gap		Cuche (355-385)	Farallones ()			Cerro Neiva ()	Deltaic, estuarine (Cuche)	900 m (3,000 ft) (Cuche)	"Paleozoic"	
360	Late Devonian		Passive margin 1	Río Cachirí (360-419)	Cuche (355-385)	Farallones ()			Ambicá ()	Alluvial-fluvial-reef (Farallones)	2,400 m (7,900 ft) (Farallones)	"Paleozoic"	
390	Early Devonian		High biodiversity	Floresta (387-400) El Tíbet					Ambicá ()	Shallow marine (Floresta)	600 m (2,000 ft) (Floresta)	"Paleozoic"	
410	Late Silurian		Silurian mystery	Floresta (387-400) El Tíbet								"Paleozoic"	
425	Early Silurian		Silurian mystery	hiatus								"Paleozoic"	
440	Late Ordovician		Rich fauna in Bolivia	San Pedro (450-490)		Duda ()						"Paleozoic"	
470	Early Ordovician		First fossils	San Pedro (450-490)	Busbanzá (>470±22) Chuscales Otengá	Guape ()		Río Nevado ()	Hígado () Agua Blanca; Venado (470-475)			"Paleozoic"	
488	Late Cambrian		Regional intrusions	Chicamocha (490-515)	Quetame ()	Ariarí ()		SJ del Guaviare (490-590)	San Isidro ()			"Paleozoic"	
515	Early Cambrian		Cambrian explosion		Quetame ()			SJ del Guaviare (490-590)	San Isidro ()			"Paleozoic"	
542	Ediacaran		Break-up of Rodinia		pre-Quetame		post-Parguaza	SJ del Guaviare (490-590)	El Barro ()	Yellow: allochthonous basement (Chibcha terrane); Green: autochthonous basement (Río Negro-Juruena Province)		Basement	
600	Neoproterozoic		Cariri Velhos orogeny	Bucaramanga (600-1400)	pre-Quetame		post-Parguaza	pre-Guaviare	El Barro ()	Yellow: allochthonous basement (Chibcha terrane); Green: autochthonous basement (Río Negro-Juruena Province)		Basement	
800	Neoproterozoic		Snowball Earth	Bucaramanga (600-1400)	pre-Quetame		post-Parguaza	pre-Guaviare	El Barro ()	Yellow: allochthonous basement (Chibcha terrane); Green: autochthonous basement (Río Negro-Juruena Province)		Basement	
1000	Mesoproterozoic		Sunsás orogeny	Bucaramanga (600-1400)	pre-Quetame	Ariarí (1000)	post-Parguaza	pre-Guaviare	La Urraca (1030-1100)	Yellow: allochthonous basement (Chibcha terrane); Green: autochthonous basement (Río Negro-Juruena Province)		Basement	
1300	Mesoproterozoic		Rondônia-Juruá orogeny	Bucaramanga (600-1400)	pre-Quetame	pre-Ariarí	Parguaza (1300-1400)	pre-Guaviare	Garzón (1180-1550)	Yellow: allochthonous basement (Chibcha terrane); Green: autochthonous basement (Río Negro-Juruena Province)		Basement	
1400	Mesoproterozoic		Rondônia-Juruá orogeny	pre-Bucaramanga	pre-Quetame	pre-Ariarí		pre-Guaviare	Garzón (1180-1550)	Yellow: allochthonous basement (Chibcha terrane); Green: autochthonous basement (Río Negro-Juruena Province)		Basement	
1600	Paleoproterozoic		Rondônia-Juruá orogeny	pre-Bucaramanga	pre-Quetame	pre-Ariarí	Maimachi (1500-1700)	pre-Guaviare	pre-Garzón	Yellow: allochthonous basement (Chibcha terrane); Green: autochthonous basement (Río Negro-Juruena Province)		Basement	
1800	Paleoproterozoic		Tapajós orogeny	pre-Bucaramanga	pre-Quetame	pre-Ariarí	Mitú (1800)	pre-Guaviare	pre-Garzón	Yellow: allochthonous basement (Chibcha terrane); Green: autochthonous basement (Río Negro-Juruena Province)		Basement	
1950	Paleoproterozoic		Transamazonic orogeny	pre-Bucaramanga	pre-Quetame	pre-Ariarí	pre-Mitú	pre-Guaviare	pre-Garzón	Yellow: allochthonous basement (Chibcha terrane); Green: autochthonous basement (Río Negro-Juruena Province)		Basement	
2200	Paleoproterozoic		Columbia	pre-Bucaramanga	pre-Quetame	pre-Ariarí	pre-Mitú	pre-Guaviare	pre-Garzón	Yellow: allochthonous basement (Chibcha terrane); Green: autochthonous basement (Río Negro-Juruena Province)		Basement	
2530	Archean		Carajas-Imataca orogeny	pre-Bucaramanga	pre-Quetame	pre-Ariarí	pre-Mitú	pre-Guaviare	pre-Garzón	Yellow: allochthonous basement (Chibcha terrane); Green: autochthonous basement (Río Negro-Juruena Province)		Basement	
3100	Archean		Kenorland	pre-Bucaramanga	pre-Quetame	pre-Ariarí	pre-Mitú	pre-Guaviare	pre-Garzón	Yellow: allochthonous basement (Chibcha terrane); Green: autochthonous basement (Río Negro-Juruena Province)		Basement	

Legend

- group
- important formation
- fossiliferous formation
- minor formation
- (age in Ma)
- proximal Llanos (Medina) (Note: based on Duarte et al. (2019), García González et al. (2009), and geological report of Villavicencio)
- distal Llanos (Saltarin 1A well) (Note: based on Duarte et al. (2019) and the hydrocarbon potential evaluation performed by the UIS and ANH in 2009)

== See also ==
- List of fossiliferous stratigraphic units in Colombia
- Geology of the Eastern Hills
- Geology of the Altiplano Cundiboyacense
