= Socotá Formation =

Geologic formation in Colombia

- Stratigraphic range: Late Aptian; ~115–112 Ma
- Type: Geological formation
- Unit of: Villeta Group
- Underlies: El Peñón Fm., Hiló Fm., Capotes Fm.
- Overlies: Trincheras Formation
- Thickness: more than 255 m (837 ft)

Lithology
- Primary: Sandstone
- Other: Shale

Location
- Coordinates: 4°31′19″N 74°33′06″W
- Region: Altiplano Cundiboyacense; Eastern Ranges, Andes
- Country: Colombia

Type section
- Named for: Socotá, Apulo
- Named by: Cáceres & Etayo
- Location: Apulo
- Year defined: 1969
- Coordinates: 4°31′19″N 74°33′06″W
- Region: Cundinamarca
- Country: Colombia
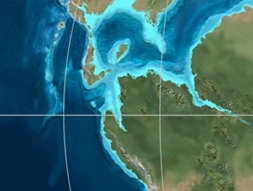
- Paleogeography of Northern South America; 120 Ma, by Ron Blakey

The Socotá Formation (Spanish: Formación Socotá, Kis) is a geological formation of the Altiplano Cundiboyacense, Eastern Ranges of the Colombian Andes. The formation consisting of a lower unit of calcareous sandstones and an upper sequence of shales dates to the Early Cretaceous period; Late Aptian epoch and in Quipile has a measured thickness of 255 metres (837 ft) with large regional variations. The formation hosts ammonite fossils.

== Etymology ==
The formation was defined as a thicker sequence and named in 1969 by Cáceres and Etayo after Socotá, a vereda of Apulo, Cundinamarca. The name Socotá in Muysccubun, the language of the native Muisca, means either "Land of the Sun and farmfields" or "Good harvest".

== Description ==
=== Lithologies ===
The Socotá Formation has a maximum thickness of 600 metres (2,000 ft), and is characterised by a lower sequence of calcareous sandstones and an upper part of shales. Fossils of the ammonites Stoyanowiceras treffryanus, Dufrenoyia sanctorum, Parahoplites (?) hubachi, and Acanthoplites (?) leptoceratiforme have been found in the Socotá Formation.

=== Stratigraphy and depositional environment ===
The Socotá Formation overlies the Trincheras Formation and is partly overlain by and partly time equivalent with the El Peñón Formation. In other areas, the formation underlies the Capotes and Hiló Formations. The age has been estimated to be Late Aptian. Stratigraphically, the formation is time equivalent with the Tablazo, Caballos and Une Formations. The formation has been deposited in a marine platform environment. in terms of sequence stratigraphy, the Socotá Formation is part of a transgressive cycle.

== Outcrops ==
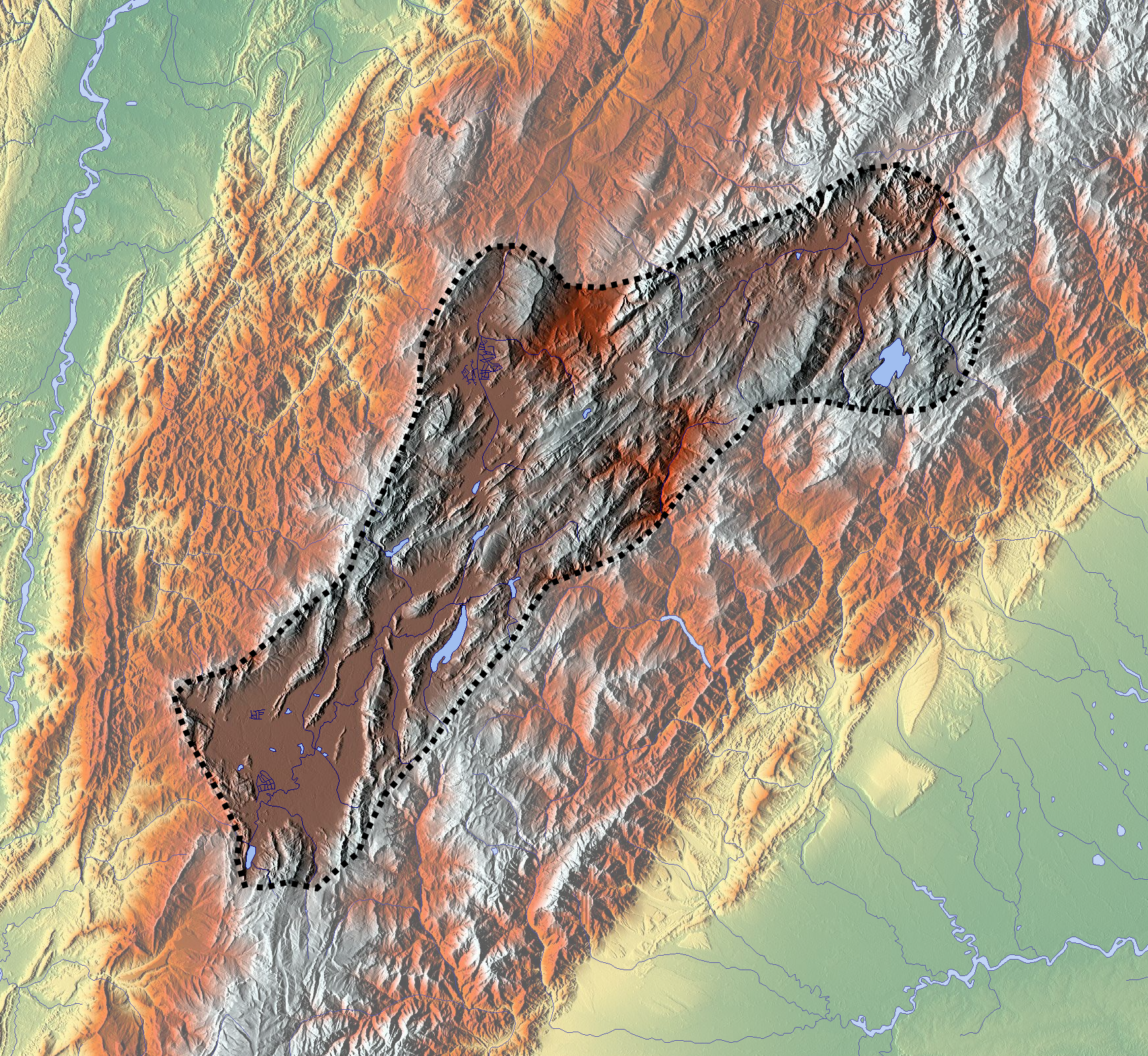
Type locality of the Socotá Formation to the southwest of the Altiplano Cundiboyacense

The Socotá Formation is apart from its type locality, found from Viotá in the south to Útica in the north. The formation crops out on both sides of the Bogotá River in Anapoima and Apulo.

== See also ==
Geology of the Eastern Hills
Geology of the Ocetá Páramo
Geology of the Altiplano Cundiboyacense
