= Fernando Etayo =

Colombian paleontologist and geologist

Dr. Fernando Etayo
- Fernando Etayo Serna
- Born: Colombia
- Education: Universidad Nacional de Colombia (M.Sc.); University of California, Berkeley (Ph.D.)
- Known for: Biostratigraphical research, Cretaceous ammonites of Colombia, definitions of geologic formations
- Awards: Louderbach Memorial Award in Stratigraphy (1975)
- Scientific career
- Fields: Geology, geophysics, palaeontology, stratigraphy
- Workplaces: INGEOMINAS
- Thesis: Zonation of the Cretaceous of Central Colombia by ammonites (1975)

Fernando Etayo Serna is a Colombian paleontologist and geologist. His contributions on the paleontology in Colombia has been mainly on the descriptions of ammonites and Etayo has helped describing many fossiliferous geologic formations of Colombia. Etayo obtained his MSc. degree in geology and geophysics from the Universidad Nacional de Colombia in 1963, and his PhD in paleontology from the University of California, Berkeley in 1975.

== Biography ==
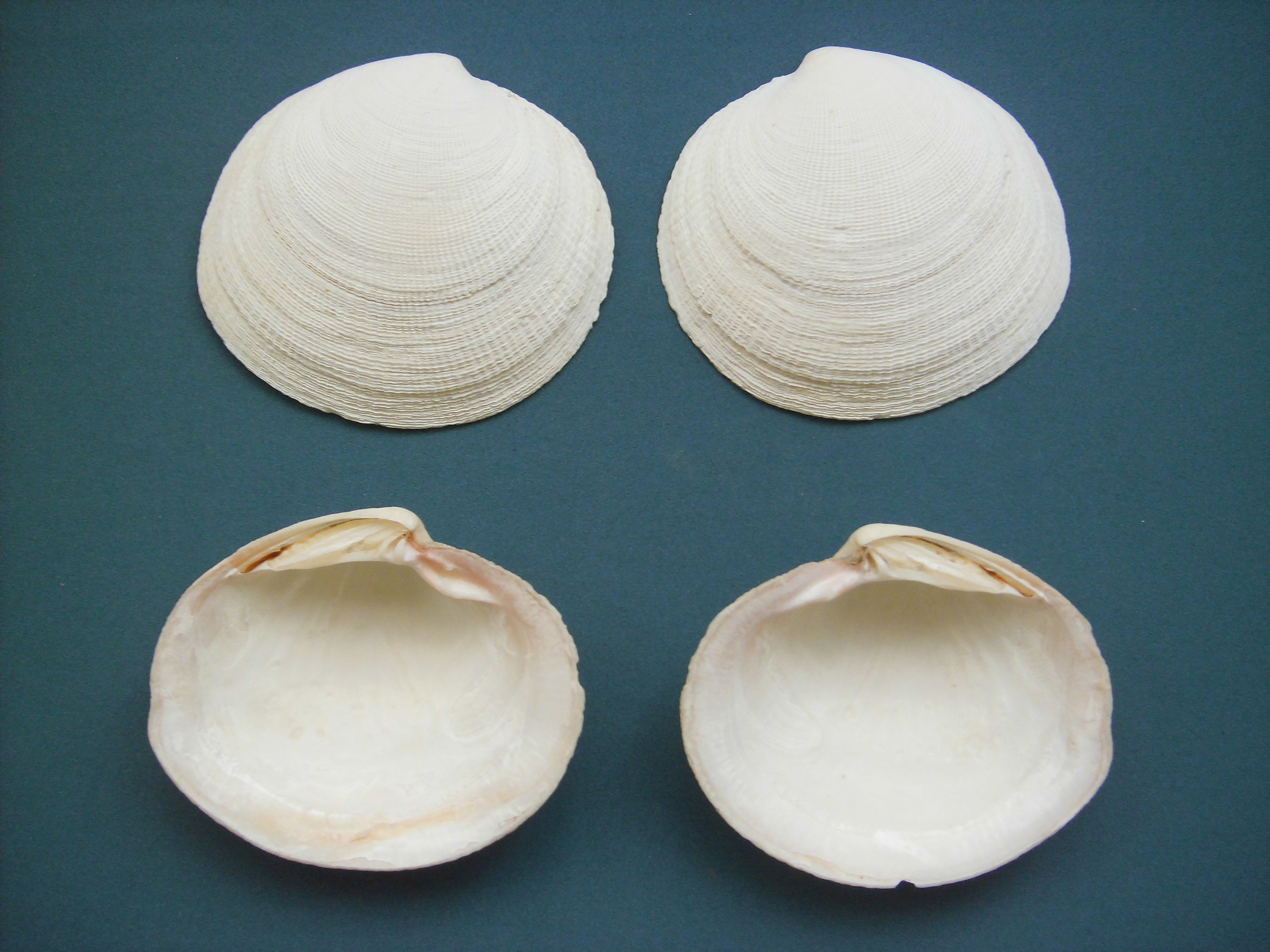
The first publication by Etayo was about Codakia orbicularis

In 1962, Etayo Serna published his first work about the species Codakia orbicularis and Codakia orbiculata. He has defined many geologic formations of Colombia in the 1960s and 1970s.

Etayo, together with fellow paleontologist María Páramo, collaborated in describing the first dinosaur fossil found in Colombia, Padillasaurus from the Paja Formation, close to Villa de Leyva, Boyacá. His work has been focused on the descriptions of the various ammonites found in the same formation. He also co-authored the 2016 publication about Stenorhynchosaurus munozi, found in the same formation.

Etayo has published in Spanish and English. In 1975, the year Etayo received his PhD degree, he was awarded the Louderbach Memorial Award in Stratigraphy from the University of California, Berkeley.

The ungulate Etayoa bacatensis, found in the Late Paleocene to Early Eocene Bogotá Formation south of Bogotá, has been named in honour of Etayo.

== Formations described by Etayo ==
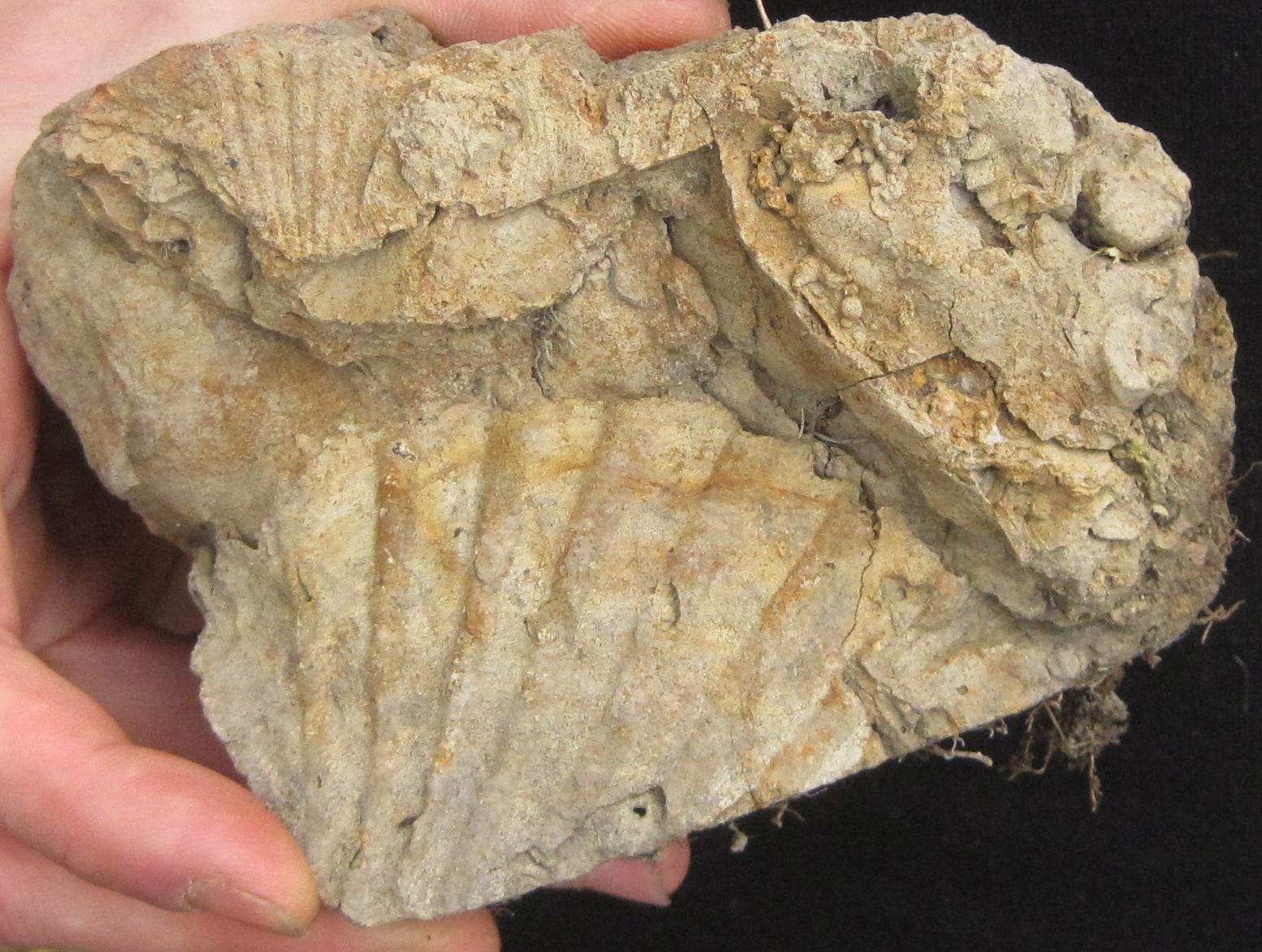
Oyster fossils from the Chipaque Formation

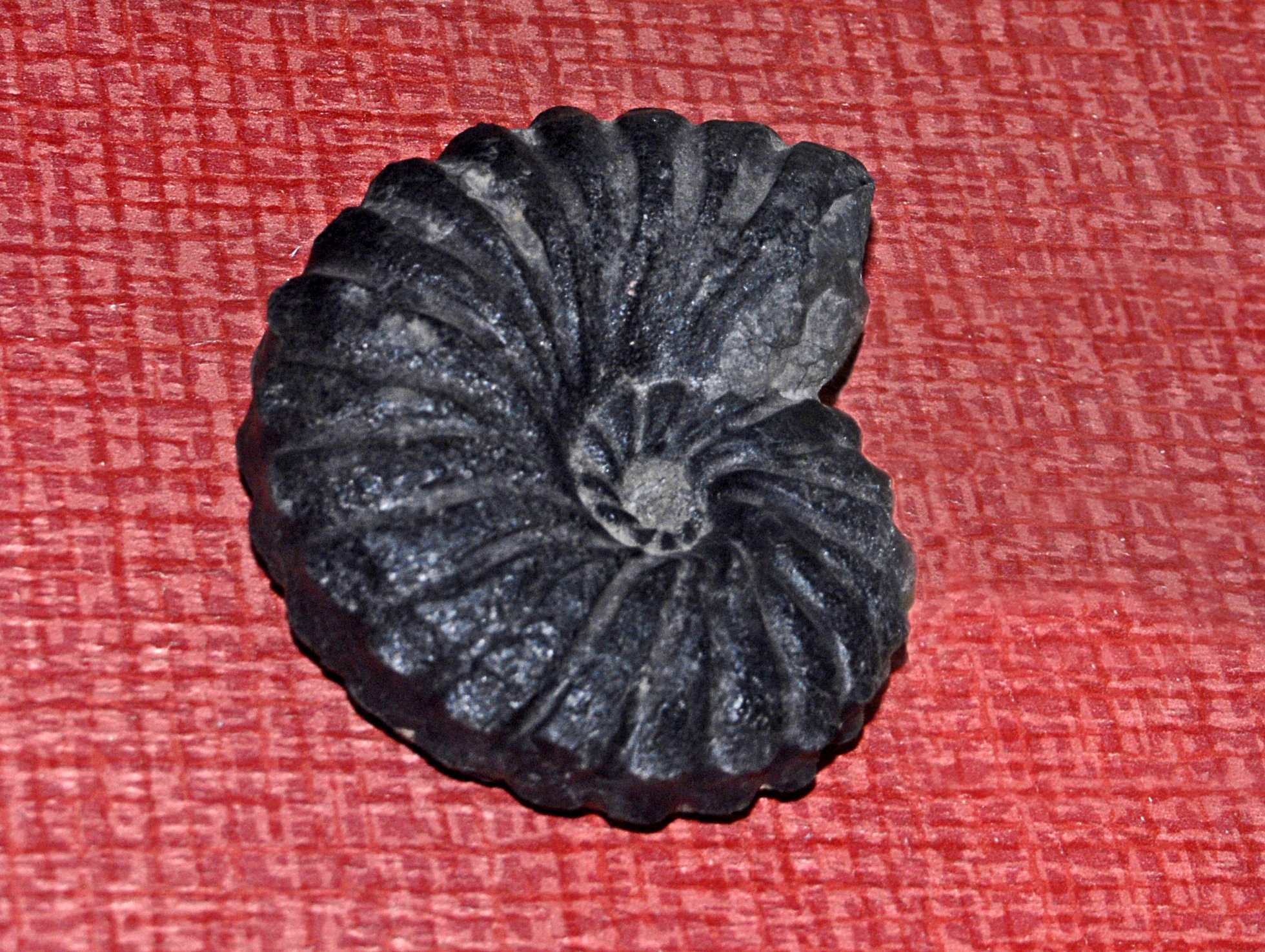
Heinzia, known from the Trincheras Fm.

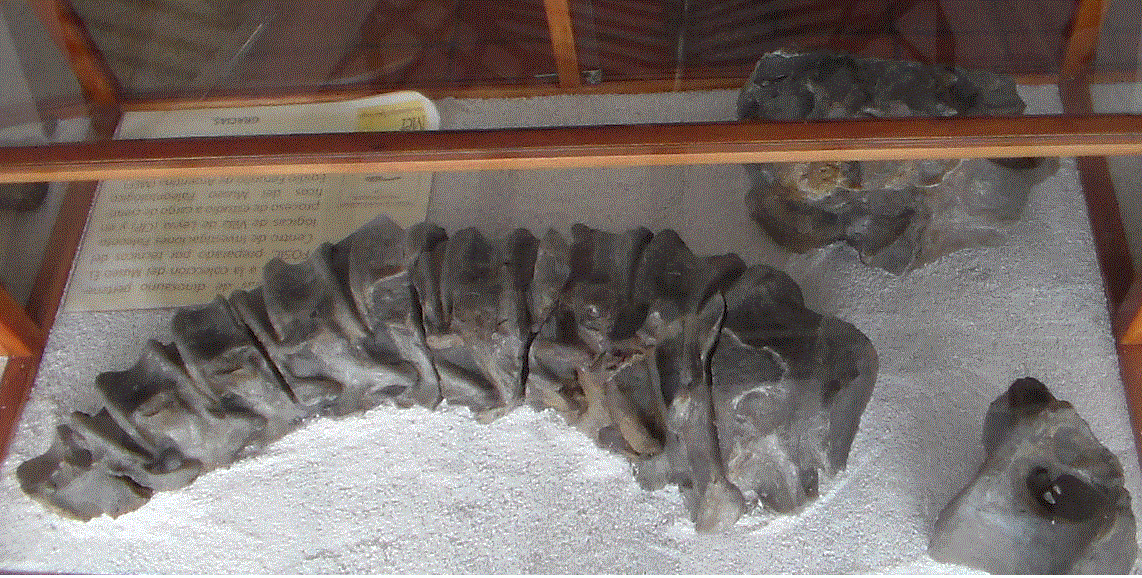
Padillasaurus leivaensis from the Paja Fm.

Age	Formation	Type locality	Year	Notes
Early Maastrichtian	La Luna Formation	Machiques	1986	
Late Campanian	La Luna Formation	Machiques	1986	
Campanian	Olini Group	Piedras	1969	
Santonian	Olini Group	Piedras	1969	
Santonian	Conejo Formation	Toca	1969	
Turonian	Conejo Formation	Toca	1969	
Turonian	La Frontera Formation	Albán	1969	
Turonian; Cenomanian	Capacho Formation	Chiscas	1985	
Turonian; Cenomanian	Chipaque Formation	Chipaque	1964	
Turonian; Cenomanian	Simijaca Formation	Simijaca	1969	
Cenomanian	Churuvita Formation	Sáchica-Samacá	1968	
Early Cenomanian	Hiló Formation	Apulo-Anapoima	1969	
Late Albian	Hiló Formation	Apulo-Anapoima	1969	
Cenomanian	Chiquinquirá Sandstone	Chiquinquirá	1968	
Mid Aptian	Chiquinquirá Sandstone	Chiquinquirá	1968	
Early Coniacian	Güagüaquí Group	Güagüaquí River	1979	
Mid Albian	Güagüaquí Group	Güagüaquí River	1979	
Early-Mid Albian	Puerto Romero Formation	Puerto Boyacá	1979	
Early Albian	Capotes Formation	Bituima-Guayabal	1969	
Early Albian	La Naveta Formation	Bogotá River	1969	
Early Albian; Late Aptian	Tibú-Mercedes Formation	Pamplona	1986	
Early Albian; Late Aptian	Tablazo Formation	Sutamarchán	1968	
Late Aptian	Socotá Formation	Apulo	1969	
Early Aptian	Trincheras Formation	Apulo	1969	
Late Aptian	Paja Formation	Villa de Leyva	1968	
Late Hauterivian	Paja Formation	Villa de Leyva	1968	
Early Hauterivian	Ritoque Formation	Villa de Leyva	1968	
Valanginian	Rosablanca Formation	Mesa de Los Santos	1968	
Early Valanginian	Cumbre Formation	Arcabuco-Moniquirá	1969	
Berriasian	Arcabuco Formation	Arcabuco	1985	
Tithonian	Arcabuco Formation	Arcabuco	1985	

== Works ==
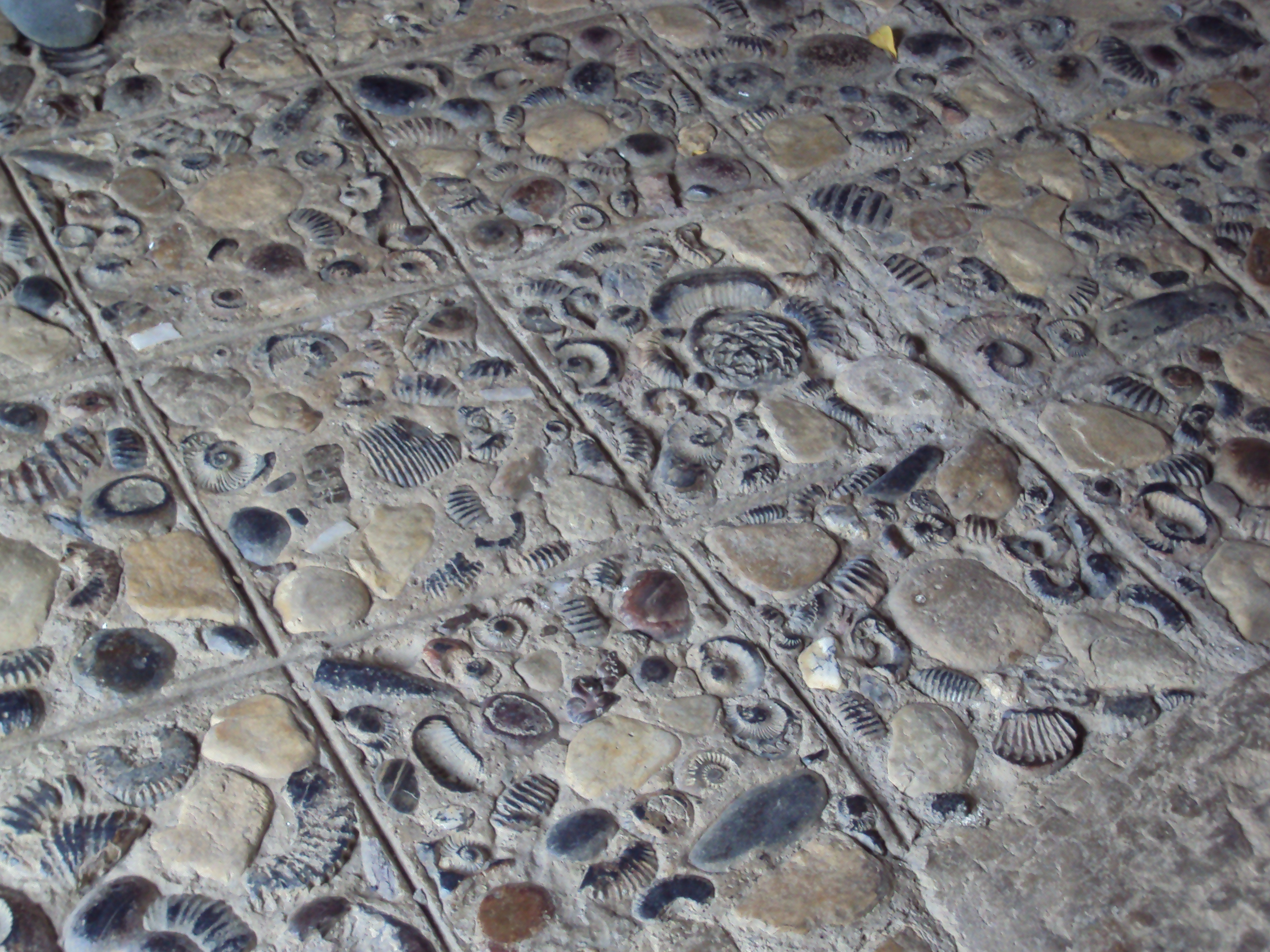
Etayo has contributed to the understanding of ammonites of Colombia, seen here close to Villa de Leyva

This list is a selection.

=== Books ===
- 1994 - Estudios geológicos del Valle Superior del Magdalena
- 1986 - Evaluación de los recursos minerales no combustibles de Colombia
- 1983 - Mapa de terrenos geológicos de Colombia
- 1979 - Zonation of the Cretaceous of central Colombia by ammonites

=== Articles ===
- 2009 - Bioestratigrafía de la Plancha 210 Guateque
- 1985 - Paleontología estratigráfica del sistema Cretácico en la Sierra Nevada del Cocuy
- 1979 - La fauna de moluscos del Paleoceno de Colombia. I. Moluscos de una capa del Paleoceno de Manantial (Guajira)
- 1968 - El Sistema Cretáceo en la región de Villa de Leiva y zonas próximas
- 1964 - Posición de las faunas en los depósitos cretácicos colombianos y su valor en la subdivisión cronológica de los mismos
- 1962 - Comprobación biométrica de las especies Codakia orbicularis y Codakia orbiculata

== See also ==
- Geology of the Altiplano Cundiboyacense
- Geology of the Eastern Hills of Bogotá
- Bogotá Formation
- Etayoa bacatensis
- María Páramo

== Notable works by Etayo ==
- Etayo Serna, Fernando; Carrillo Castillo, Gonzalo (1996), "Bioestratigrafía del cretácico mediante Macrofósiles en la Sección El Ocal, Valle Superior del Magdalena, Colombia" (PDF), Geología Colombiana, 20: 81–92, archived from the original (PDF) on 6 August 2017
- Etayo Serna, Fernando (1983), Mapa de terrenos geológicos de Colombia, El Instituto, pp. 1–235
- Terraza, Roberto; Montoya, Diana; Reyes, Germán; Moreno, Giovanni; Fúquen, Jaime; Torres Jaimes, Eliana; López Cardona, Myriam; Nivia Guevara, Álvaro; Etayo Serna, Fernando (2013), Geología de la Plancha 229 - Gachalá - 1:100,000 (PDF), Servicio Geológico Colombiano, pp. 1–296, archived from the original (PDF) on 6 August 2017

=== Maps ===
- Renzoni, Giancarlo; Rosas, Humberto; Etayo Serna, Fernando (1998), Plancha 191 - Tunja - 1:100,000, INGEOMINAS, p. 1
- Buitrago, José Alberto; Terraza M., Roberto; Etayo, Fernando (1998), Plancha 228 - Santafé de Bogotá Noreste - 1:100,000, INGEOMINAS, p. 1
