= El Peñón Formation =

Geologic formation in Colombia

- Stratigraphic range: Late Aptian; ~115–112 Ma
- Type: Geological formation
- Unit of: Villeta Group
- Underlies: Capotes Formation
- Overlies: Trincheras Formation
- Thickness: more than 381 m (1,250 ft)

Lithology
- Primary: Calcareous shale
- Other: Siltstone, gypsum

Location
- Coordinates: 5°15′13″N 74°20′28″W
- Region: Altiplano Cundiboyacense; Eastern Ranges, Andes
- Country: Colombia

Type section
- Named for: El Peñón
- Named by: Ulloa
- Location: El Peñón
- Year defined: 1982
- Coordinates: 5°15′13″N 74°20′28″W
- Region: Cundinamarca
- Country: Colombia
- Thickness at type section: 381 m (1,250 ft)
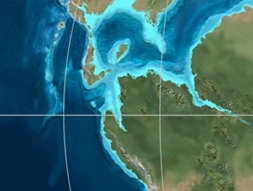
- Paleogeography of Northern South America; 120 Ma, by Ron Blakey

The El Peñón Formation (Spanish: Formación El Peñón, Kipe) is a geological formation of the Altiplano Cundiboyacense, Eastern Ranges of the Colombian Andes. The formation consists of calcareous shales and siltstones and dates to the Early Cretaceous period; Late Aptian epoch and has a measured thickness at its type section of 381 metres (1,250 ft). Ammonite fossils have been found in the formation, deposited in a shallow marine platform environment.

== Etymology ==
The formation was defined and named in 1982 by Ulloa after El Peñón, Cundinamarca.

== Description ==
=== Lithologies ===
The El Peñón Formation has at is type section a thickness of 381 metres (1,250 ft), and is characterised by a sequence of calcareous shales and siltstones. The middle part of the sequence contains gypsum. Fossils of the ammonites Cheloniceras sp. and Epicheloniceras sp. aff. carlosacostai have been found in the El Peñón Formation.

=== Stratigraphy and depositional environment ===
The El Peñón Formation, part of the Villeta Group, conformably overlies the Trincheras Formation and is conformably overlain by the Capotes Formation. The age has been estimated to be Late Aptian. Stratigraphically, the formation is time equivalent with the Tablazo Formation and a lateral facies equivalent of the Socotá Formation. The formation has been deposited in a shallow marine platform environment. In the Late Aptian, central Colombia was dominated by shallow marine carbonate platform environments.

== Outcrops ==
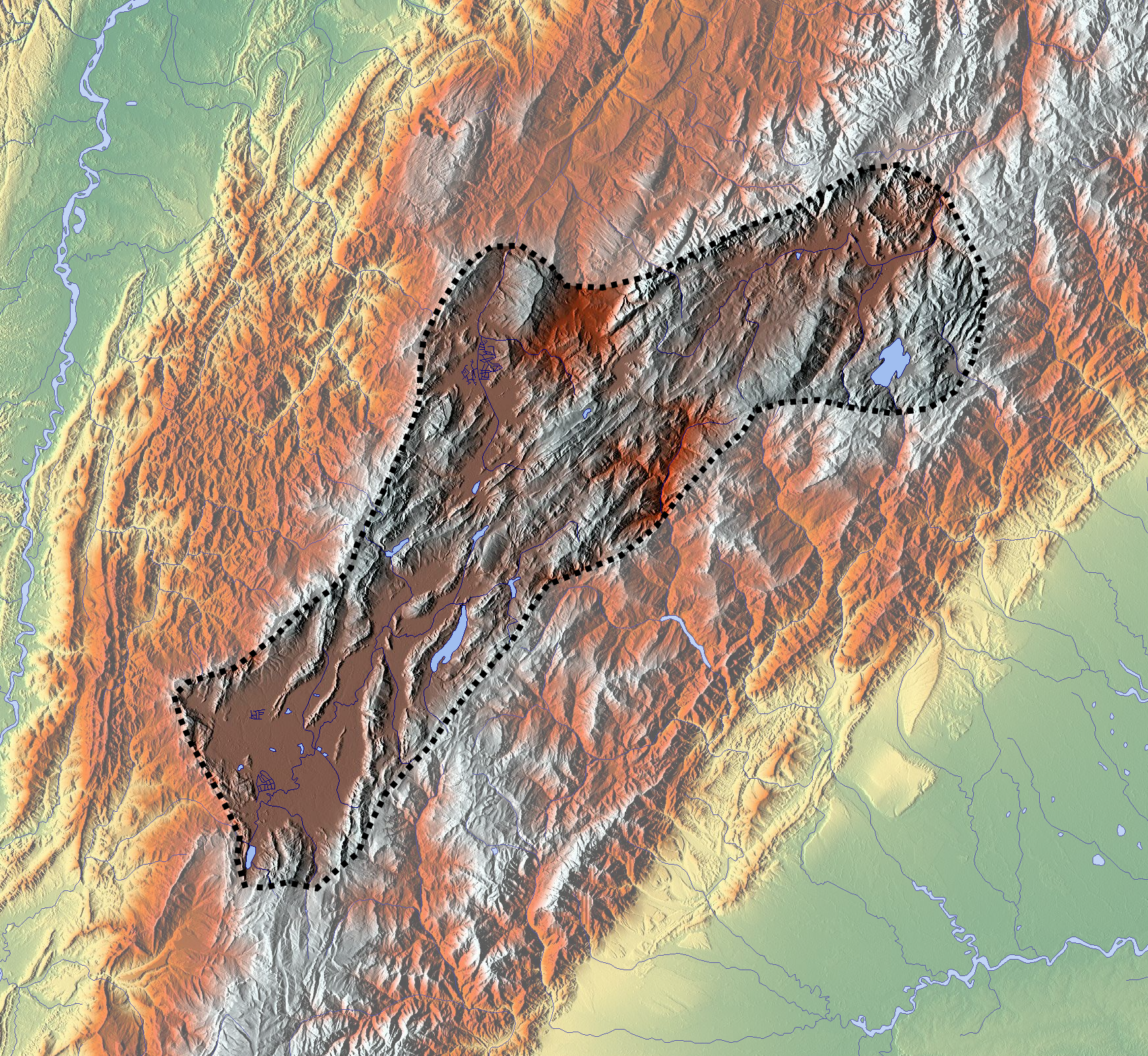
Type locality of the El Peñón Formation to the west of the Altiplano Cundiboyacense

The El Peñón Formation, restricted to Cundinamarca, is locally found around its type locality, between Bituima and Guayabal de Síquima, and along the road from Villeta to Sasaima.

== See also ==
Geology of the Eastern Hills
Geology of the Ocetá Páramo
Geology of the Altiplano Cundiboyacense
