= La Frontera Formation =

Geological formation

- Stratigraphic range: Turonian; ~93.9–89.8 Ma
- Type: Geological formation
- Unit of: Villeta Group
- Underlies: Conejo Formation
- Overlies: Simijaca Fm., La Corona Gb.
- Thickness: up to 206 metres (680 ft)

Lithology
- Primary: Lydite
- Other: Limestone

Location
- Coordinates: 4°54′40″N 74°27′50″W
- Region: Altiplano Cundiboyacense; Eastern Ranges, Andes
- Country: Colombia

Type section
- Named for: La Frontera quarry
- Named by: Cáceres & Etayo
- Location: Albán
- Year defined: 1969
- Coordinates: 4°54′40″N 74°27′50″W
- Region: Cundinamarca, Boyacá
- Country: Colombia
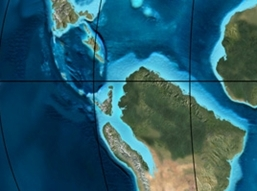
- Paleogeography of Northern South America; 90 Ma, by Ron Blakey

The La Frontera Formation (Spanish: Formación La Frontera, K_{2}F, Ksf) is a geological formation, part of the Villeta Group, of the Altiplano Cundiboyacense and neighbouring areas of the Eastern Ranges of the Colombian Andes. The sequence of limestones and lydites dates to the Late Cretaceous period; Turonian epoch and has a maximum thickness of 206 metres (676 ft).

Fossils of Yaguarasaurus columbianus were said to be found in this formation (listed as "La Frontera Member"), although the geological mapping of the area state the time-equivalent Hondita Formation as the stratigraphic unit present in the Quebradas El Ocal and Itaibe in Huila. The La Frontera Formation does not outcrop south of Cundinamarca. A high diversity of ammonites has been found in the La Frontera Formation.

== Etymology ==
The formation was first described by Hubach in 1931 and elevated to formation in 1969 by Cáceres and Etayo. The formation is named after the quarry La Frontera near Albán, Cundinamarca.

== Description ==
=== Lithologies ===
The La Frontera Formation is characterised by a lower part consisting of limestones and an upper part comprising lydites.

=== Stratigraphy and depositional environment ===
The La Frontera Formation overlies the Simijaca Formation and is overlain by the Conejo Formation, all units belong to the Villeta Group. The age has been estimated to be Turonian. Stratigraphically, the formation is time equivalent with the Chipaque, Hondita and La Luna Formations. The formation has been deposited in an open marine platform to submarine fan setting. The deposition is represented by a maximum flooding surface. The formation contains concretions and a high diversity of ammonites; Wrightoceras munieri, Vascoceras cf. constrictum, Vascoceras cf. venezolanum, Kamerunoceras sp., Kamerunoceras cf. turoniense, Hoplitoides cf. lagiraldae, Codazziceras ospinae, Coilopoceras cf. newelli, Hoplitoides wohltmanni, Neoptychites crassus, Hoplitoides ingens, Mammites sp., ?Fagesia sp., and Prionocycloceras sp. Also the bivalves Anomia colombiana and Inoceramus sp. have been found in the La Frontera Formation.

=== Yaguarasaurus ===
Fossils of Yaguarasaurus columbianus were described as coming from the "La Frontera Member", part of the "Villeta Formation", in the Quebrada El Ocal, 26 kilometres (16 mi) southwest of Neiva, Huila, and in the Quebrada Itaibe 78 kilometres (48 mi) southwest of Neiva, although in these areas the time-equivalent Hondita Formation is mapped.

== Outcrops ==
Type locality of the La Frontera Formation to the west of the Bogotá savanna

The La Frontera Formation is apart from its type locality, found at surface in the north of the Bogotá savanna, in the Tabio anticlinal, along the road Ubaté-Carmen de Carupa, north and east of Chiquinquirá, south of Cachipay, to a thin band east of Viotá.

== See also ==
Geology of the Eastern Hills
Geology of the Ocetá Páramo
Geology of the Altiplano Cundiboyacense
