= Villeta Group =

Geological group in central Colombia

- Stratigraphic range: Aptian-Coniacian; ~125–87 Ma
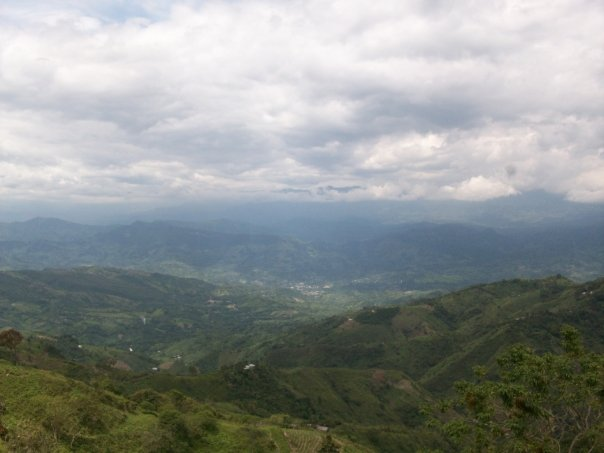
- Villeta, type locality of the Villeta Group
- Type: Geological group
- Sub-units: Conejo Fm., La Frontera Fm., Simijaca Fm., Hiló Fm., Pacho Fm., Chiquinquirá Sst., Capotes Fm., Socotá Fm., El Peñón Fm., Trincheras Fm.
- Underlies: Guadalupe Group
- Overlies: La Naveta Formation

Lithology
- Primary: Sandstone, shale, limestone

Location
- Coordinates: 5°00′59″N 74°28′54″W
- Region: Altiplano Cundiboyacense; Eastern Ranges, Andes
- Country: Colombia

Type section
- Named for: Villeta
- Named by: Humboldt
- Year defined: 1810
- Coordinates: 4°35′31″N 74°03′15″W
- Region: Cundinamarca, Boyacá, Huila, Santander
- Country: Colombia
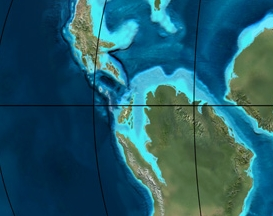
- Paleogeography of northern South America; 105 Ma, by Ron Blakey

The Villeta Group (Spanish: Grupo Villeta) is a geological group of the Eastern Ranges of the Colombian Andes, to the west of the Altiplano Cundiboyacense. The group, a sequence of shales, limestones and sandstones, is subdivided into various formations; Conejo, La Frontera, Simijaca, Hiló, Pacho, Chiquinquirá, Capotes, Socotá, El Peñón, and Trincheras, and dates to the Cretaceous period; Aptian-Coniacian epochs. The group stretches out across four departments, from Huila in the south, through Cundinamarca and Boyacá to southern Santander in the north. The upper part of the Villeta Group is time-equivalent with the La Luna Formation of the Middle Magdalena Valley (VMM) and Sierra Nevada del Cocuy, the Oliní and Güagüaquí Groups of the Guaduas-Vélez synclinal and the Chipaque Formation of the Altiplano Cundiboyacense. The lower part has been correlated with the Simití, Tablazo and Paja Formations of the VMM, the upper Tibasosa, Une and Fómeque Formations of the Altiplano Cundiboyacense and the Capacho, Aguardiente, Tibú-Mercedes and upper Río Negro Formations of the Sierra Nevada del Cocuy.

== Etymology ==
The group was first described by Alexander Von Humboldt around 1810 as the "Villeta Tonschiefer", German name for Villeta's clay slate. The group was subsequently published in 1892 by Hettner in his book Die Kordilleren von Bogotá and named after its type locality Villeta on the western flanks of the Eastern Ranges of the Colombian Andes.

== Description ==
=== Lithologies ===
The sequence comprises an alternation of sandstones, shales and limestones and the lithologies and lateral facies variations are described in detail in the various formations comprising the group. Mineralizations of zinc, cadmium and molybdenum have been found in the Villeta Group.

=== Stratigraphy and depositional environment ===
The Villeta Group overlies the La Naveta Formation and is overlain by the Guadalupe Group. The age has been estimated to be Aptian-Coniacian and the unit is subdivided into the Conejo, La Frontera, Simijaca, Hiló, Pacho Formations, the Chiquinquirá Sandstone, and the Capotes, Socotá, El Peñón, and Trincheras Formations. The core extent of the group has been defined by Cáceres and Etayo in 1969, running from Apulo in the south to Muzo in the north. The Villeta Group has been deposited in a marine environment and the organic rich shales and pelagic limestones and cherts of the Villeta Group and equivalent units comprise 60-70% of the Cretaceous record in the Eastern Ranges. They provide a good opportunity to study the interactions between tectonics eustatic sea level and sedimentation that regulate relative sea level in a basin.

== Outcrops ==
Type locality of the Villeta Group to the northwest of the Bogotá savanna

The formations of the Villeta Group are apart from its type locality near Villeta, found in other parts of the western flanks of the Eastern Ranges, stretching from Huila in the south to southern Santander in the north.

== See also ==
Geology of the Eastern Hills
Geology of the Ocetá Páramo
Geology of the Altiplano Cundiboyacense
