= Capotes Formation =

Geological formation in Colombia

- Stratigraphic range: Early Albian; ~112–108 Ma
- Type: Geological formation
- Unit of: Villeta Group
- Underlies: Hiló Formation
- Overlies: El Peñón Fm., Socotá Fm.
- Thickness: 550 m (1,800 ft)

Lithology
- Primary: Calcareous black shale
- Other: Gypsum

Location
- Coordinates: 5°15′13″N 74°20′28″W
- Region: Eastern Ranges, Andes
- Country: Colombia

Type section
- Named for: Hacienda Capotes, Viotá
- Named by: Cáceres & Etayo
- Location: Bituima-Guayabal
- Year defined: 1969
- Coordinates: 5°15′13″N 74°20′28″W
- Region: Cundinamarca
- Country: Colombia
- Thickness at type section: 550 m (1,800 ft)
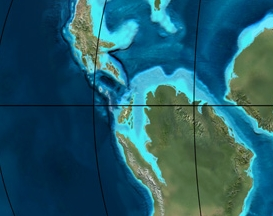
- Paleogeography of Northern South America; 105 Ma, by Ron Blakey

The Capotes Formation (Spanish: Formación Capotes, Kic) is a geological formation of the Altiplano Cundiboyacense, Eastern Ranges of the Colombian Andes. The formation consists of calcareous black shales containing gypsum and ammonites and dates to the Early Cretaceous period; Early Albian epoch and has an approximate thickness at its type section of 550 metres (1,800 ft).

== Etymology ==
The formation was defined in 1969 by Cáceres and Etayo as a member of the Socotá Formation. The name is derived from Hacienda Capotes, southeast of Viotá.

== Description ==
=== Lithologies ===
The Capotes Formation has a thickness at its type section of approximately 550 metres (1,800 ft), and is characterised by a sequence of organic rich calcareous shales with gypsum. Fossils of Douvilleiceras solitae, Neodeshayesites columbianus and Paracrioceras sp. have been found in the Capotes Formation.

=== Stratigraphy and depositional environment ===
The Capotes Formation, part of the Villeta Group, overlies the Socotá and El Peñón Formations, and is overlain by the Hiló Formation. The age has been estimated to be Early Albian. Stratigraphically, the formation is time equivalent with the Simití Formation. The formation has been deposited in a quiet enclosed shallow marine environment. In terms of sequence stratigraphy, the Albian of current central Colombia experienced a transgressive to highstand sequence.

== Outcrops ==
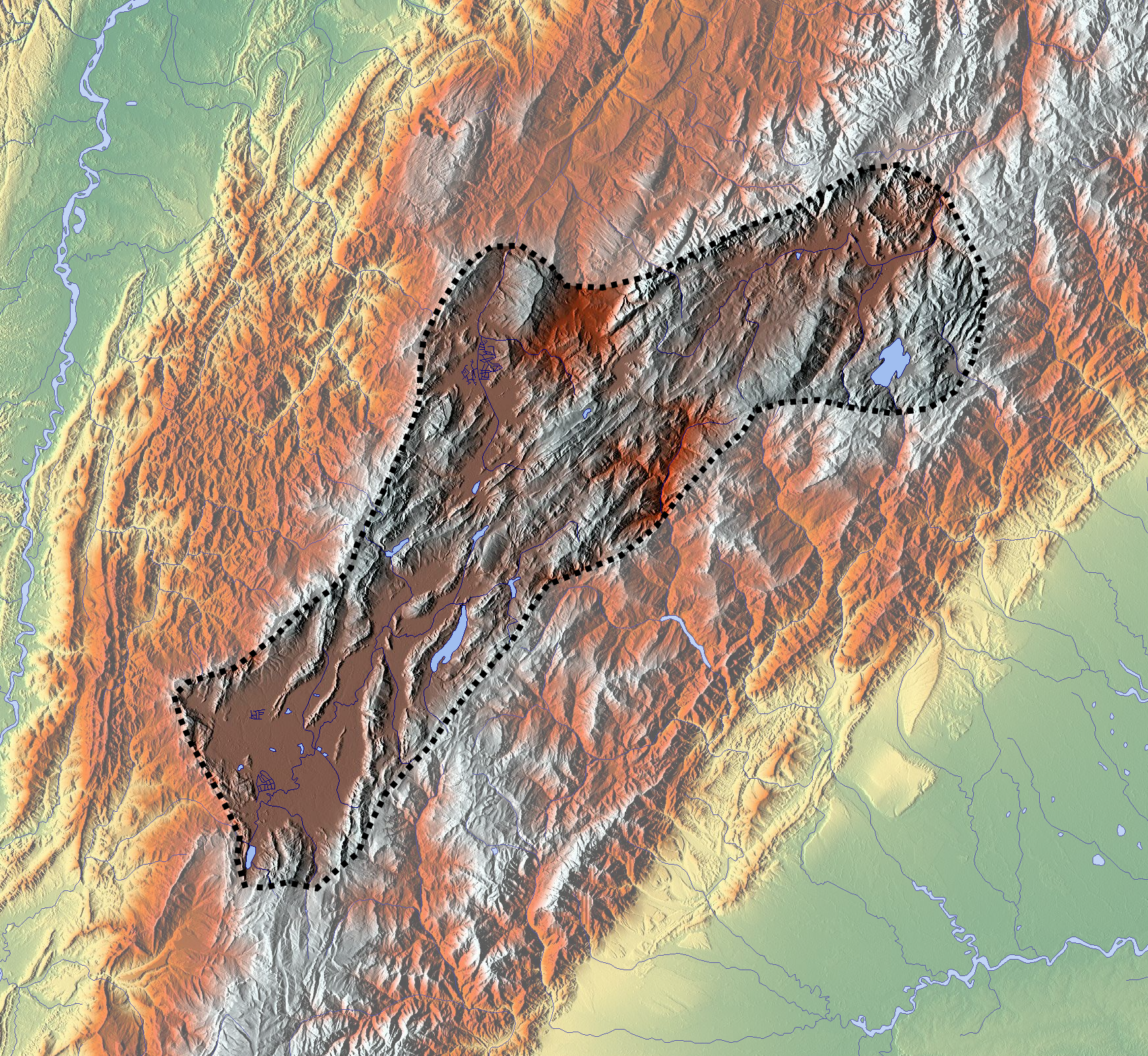
Type locality of the Capotes Formation to the west of the Altiplano Cundiboyacense

The Capotes Formation is apart from its type locality along the road between Bituima and Guayabal, also found north and southeast of Viotá, and north and east of La Mesa.

== See also ==
Geology of the Eastern Hills
Geology of the Ocetá Páramo
Geology of the Altiplano Cundiboyacense
