= Hiló Formation =

Geological formation in the Colombian Andes

- Stratigraphic range: Late Albian-Early Cenomanian; ~102–98 Ma
- Type: Geological formation
- Unit of: Villeta Group
- Underlies: Simijaca Formation
- Overlies: Capotes Formation
- Thickness: more than 470 metres (1,540 ft)

Lithology
- Primary: Shale
- Other: Sandstone, limestone, siltstone

Location
- Coordinates: 4°47′28″N 74°30′49″W
- Region: Altiplano Cundiboyacense; Eastern Ranges, Andes
- Country: Colombia

Type section
- Named for: Caserío Boquerón de Hiló
- Named by: Hubach
- Location: Apulo-Anapoima
- Year defined: 1931
- Coordinates: 4°47′28″N 74°30′49″W
- Approximate paleocoordinates: 0.6°N 45.3°W
- Region: Cundinamarca, Tolima
- Country: Colombia
- Thickness at type section: 470 m (1,540 ft)
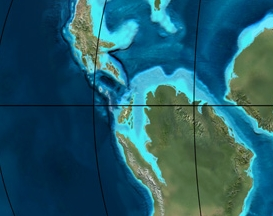
- Paleogeography of Northern South America; 105 Ma, by Ron Blakey

The Hiló Formation (Spanish: Formación Hiló, Kih) is a geological formation of the Altiplano Cundiboyacense, Eastern Ranges of the Colombian Andes. The predominantly shale formation dates to the Middle Cretaceous period; Late Albian to Early Cenomanian epochs and has a measured thickness at its type section of 470 metres (1,540 ft). The fossiliferous formation has provided a great abundance of ammonites and other marine species.

== Etymology ==
The formation was defined and named in 1931 by Hubach after the Caserío Boquerón de Hiló in Anapoima.

== Description ==
=== Lithologies ===
The Hiló Formation with a measured thickness of 470 metres (1,540 ft), is characterised by a sequence of pyritic organic shales, limestones and siltstones, with sandstone banks intercalated in the formation.

=== Stratigraphy and depositional environment ===
The Hiló Formation overlies the Capotes Formation and is overlain by the Simijaca Formation. The age has been estimated to be Late Albian to Early Cenomanian. Stratigraphically, the formation is time equivalent with the Une and Pacho Formations. The formation has been deposited in an open platform setting. The deposition is represented by a maximum flooding surface and pelagic to hemipelagic conditions.

== Fossil content ==
Fossils of Actinoceramus munsoni, Actinoceramus aff. subsulcatiformis, Beudanticeras cf. rebouli, Desmoceras latidorsatum, Eubrancoceras cf. aegoceratoides, Exogyra aff. texana, Goodhallites aguilerae, Inoceramus anglicus, Inoceramus cf. cadottensis, Inoceramus aff. dunveganensis, Inoceramus aff. etheridgei, Inoceramus cf. ewaldi, Inoceramus aff. irenensis, Inoceramus prefragilis, Inoceramus cf. richensis, Lyelliceras pseudolyelli, Mojsisovicsia evansi, Mortoniceras arietiforme, Neocomiceramus neocomiensis, Neoharpoceras hugardianum, Oxytropidoceras intermedium, Oxytropidoceras karsteni, Oxytropidoceras laraense, Oxytropidoceras multicostatum, Oxytropidoceras nodosum, Oxytropidoceras peruvianum, ?Oxytropidoceras robustum, Oxytropidoceras venezolanum, Prolyelliceras gevreyi, Prolyelliceras prorsocurvatum, Puzio media, Tegoceras mosense, Acompsoceras sp., ?Bositra sp., Camptonectes sp., Entolium sp., Hamites sp., Hysteroceras sp., Mariella sp., Ostrea sp., Phelopteria sp., and ?Syncyclonema sp. have been found in the Hiló Formation.

== Outcrops ==
Type locality of the Hiló Formation to the west of the Bogotá savanna

The Hiló Formation is apart from its type locality along the road from Apulo to Anapoima, found just east of Viotá, Cundinamarca, and in the department of Tolima. West of Guayabal de Síquima, the formation is offset by the Vianí Fault.

== See also ==
Geology of the Eastern Hills
Geology of the Ocetá Páramo
Geology of the Altiplano Cundiboyacense
