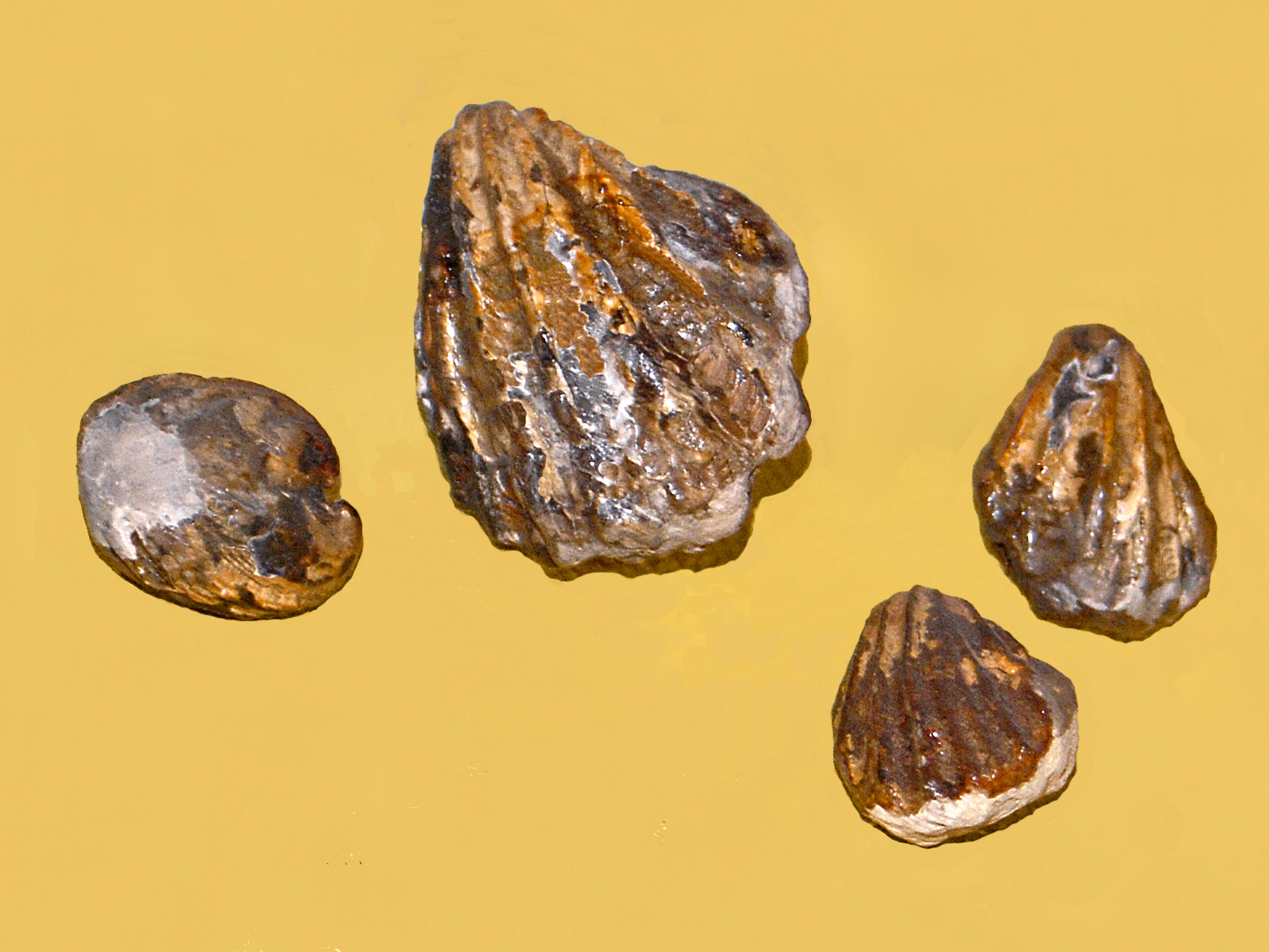
- Fossil Inoceramus (Actinoceramus) sulcatus from Albian age of England at Galerie de paléontologie et d'anatomie comparée, Paris

Scientific classification
- Kingdom: Animalia
- Phylum: Mollusca
- Class: Bivalvia
- Order: Pteriida
- Family: †Inoceramidae
- Genus: †Actinoceramus; Meek, 1864

= Actinoceramus =

Actinoceramus Temporal range: Albian-Cenomanian, 109–89.3 Ma

Extinct genus of bivalves

Actinoceramus is an extinct genus of fossil saltwater clams, marine pteriomorphian bivalve molluscs. These bivalves were facultatively mobile infaunal suspension feeders.

Actinoceramus sulcatus marks the oldest appearance of well-developed radial folds, though the functional significance is still under debate. The wide range of localities and abundance of fossils coupled with an ease of identification leads scientists to consider this genus the most "successful" marine bivalve of the Late Cretaceous.

== Species ==
Species within Actinoceramus:

- Inoceramus (Actinoceramus) concentricus Parkinson 1819
- Inoceramus (Actinoceramus) salomoni d'Orbigny 1850
- Inoceramus (Actinoceramus) subsulcatus Wiltshire 1869
- Inoceramus (Actinoceramus) sulcatus Parkinson 1819

== Distribution ==
Fossils of species of this genus have been found in the Cretaceous of Antarctica, Australia, Brazil, Canada, Colombia (Hiló Formation, Tolima), Ecuador, Egypt, France, Germany, Italy, Japan, New Zealand, Peru, Russia, Spain, the United Kingdom and the United States.
