= Pacho Formation =

Geological formation in the Colombian Andes

- Stratigraphic range: Late Albian-Cenomanian; ~102–97 Ma
- Type: Geological formation
- Unit of: Villeta Group
- Underlies: Simijaca Formation
- Overlies: Hiló Formation
- Thickness: ~1,050 m (3,440 ft)

Lithology
- Primary: Siltstone
- Other: Shale

Location
- Coordinates: 4°27′07″N 74°03′20″W
- Region: Altiplano Cundiboyacense; Eastern Ranges, Andes
- Country: Colombia

Type section
- Named for: Pacho
- Named by: Ulloa
- Location: Pacho
- Year defined: 1982
- Coordinates: 4°27′07″N 74°03′20″W
- Region: Cundinamarca
- Country: Colombia
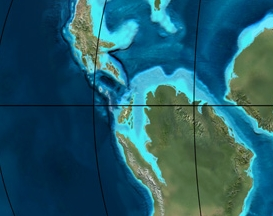
- Paleogeography of Northern South America; 105 Ma, by Ron Blakey

The Pacho Formation (Spanish: Limolitas de Pacho, Kslp) is a geological formation of the Altiplano Cundiboyacense, Eastern Ranges of the Colombian Andes. The formation consisting of alternating siltstones and shales with siderite concretions dates to the Middle Cretaceous period; Late Albian to Cenomanian epochs and has an approximate thickness of 1,050 metres (3,440 ft).

== Etymology ==
The formation was defined and named in 1982 by Ulloa after Pacho, Cundinamarca.

== Description ==
=== Lithologies ===
The Pacho Formation has an approximate thickness of 1,050 metres (3,440 ft), and is characterised by a sequence of alternating siltstones and shales with siderite concretions.

=== Stratigraphy and depositional environment ===
The Pacho Formation, pertaining to the Villeta Group, partly overlies and is partly lateral equivalent with the Hiló Formation and is partly overlain by and partly time equivalent with the Simijaca Formation. The age has been estimated to be Late Albian to Cenomanian. Stratigraphically, the formation is time equivalent with the Une Formation. The formation has been deposited in an outer marine platform environment.

== Outcrops ==
Type locality of the Pacho Formation to the northwest of the Bogotá savanna

The Pacho Formation is found around its type locality near Pacho.

== See also ==
Geology of the Eastern Hills
Geology of the Ocetá Páramo
Geology of the Altiplano Cundiboyacense
