= Sasaima =

- Municipality and town
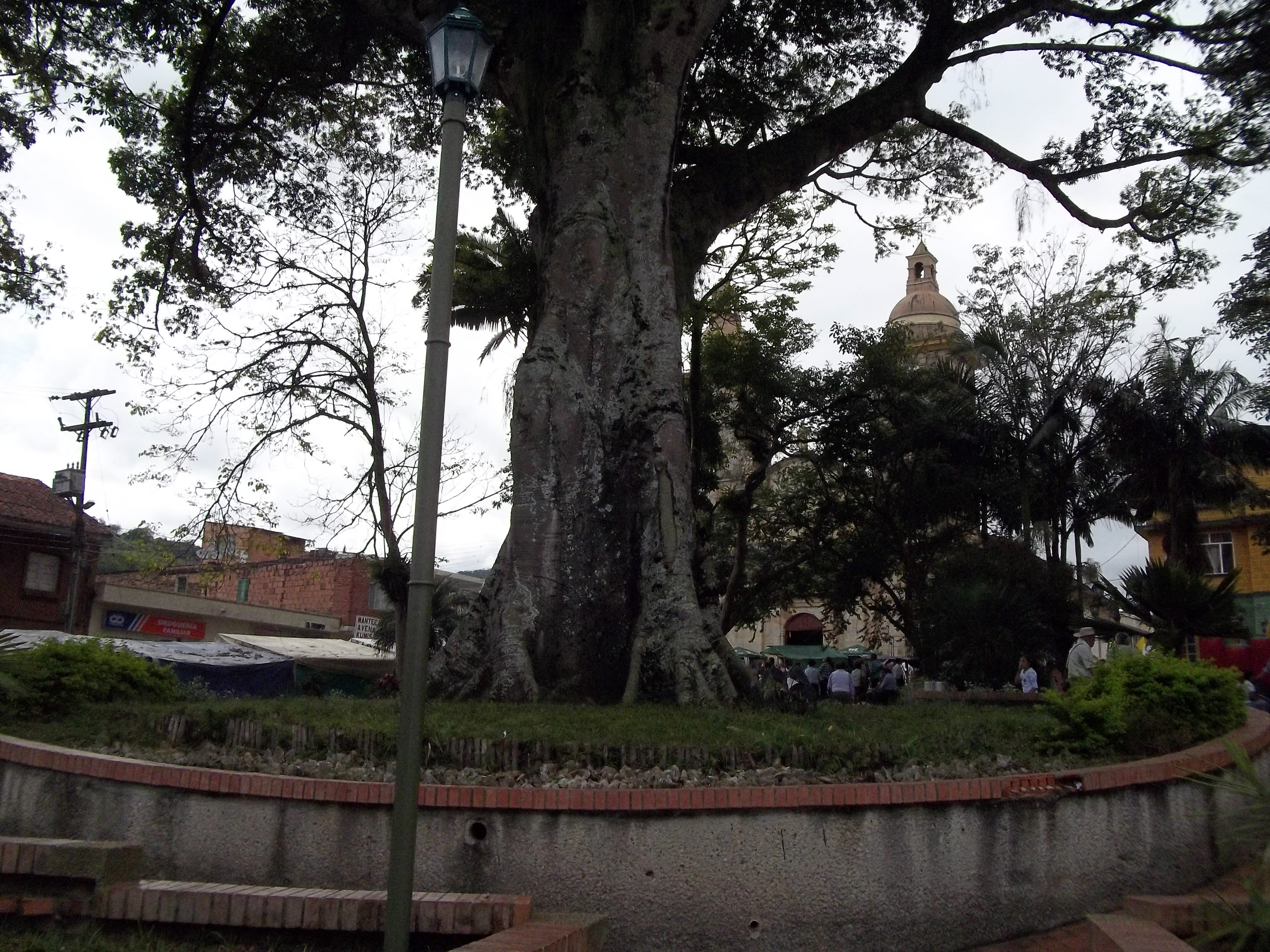

- Flag Seal

- Location in Colombia
- Coordinates: 4°57′54″N 74°26′5″W
- Country: Colombia
- Department: Cundinamarca

Population (Census 2018)
  - Total: 9,807
- Time zone: UTC-5 (Colombia Standard Time)

Sasaima (Spanish pronunciation: [saˈsajma]) is a municipality and town of Colombia in the department of Cundinamarca. The municipality was established in 1605 by Alonso Vasquez de Cisneros. The mayor is Gonzalo Parra Bohorquez.
