= Útica =

- Municipality and town
- Flag Coat of arms

- Location of the municipality and town of Gómez Plata in the Antioquia Department of Colombia

- Location in Colombia
- Coordinates: 5°11′N 74°29′W
- Country: Colombia
- Department: Cundinamarca
- Time zone: UTC-5 (Colombia Standard Time)

Utica is a town and municipality in the Cundinamarca Department, Colombia located some 127 kilometers from Bogotá. The village lies at an altitude of 506 meters above sea level and has an average daily temperature of 26 °C.

Utica grew from a small fishing community, with the Rio Negro and the Quebradanegra running through it. The village is prone to flooding, caused by heavy rains further up the Andes causing the rivers to burst their banks. The most severe flood washed away the village bridge and unearthed the corpses from the cemetery.

The village is a vacation spot particularly promoting extreme sports such as rafting and abseiling.

The village is said to have been founded by Manuel Murillo Toro c. 1802 who stopped whilst travelling, liked the area and built a house. The building remains as the defunct railway station in Curapo.
