= Guayabal de Síquima =

- Municipality and town
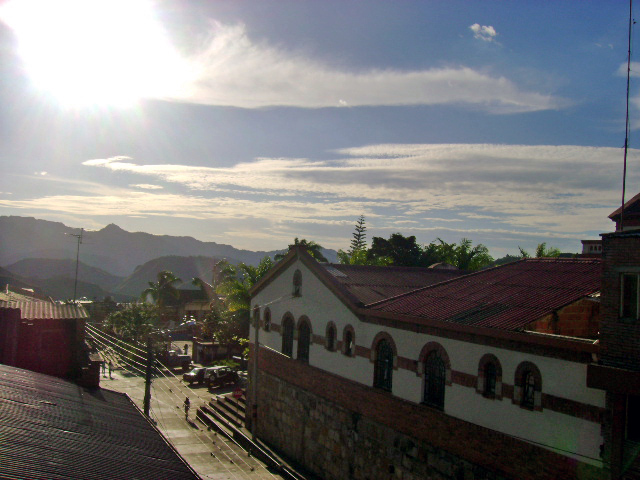

- Flag Coat of arms

- Location of the municipality and town inside Cundinamarca Department of Colombia

- Location in Colombia
- Coordinates: 4°52′N 74°28′W
- Country: Colombia
- Department: Cundinamarca
- Elevation: 1,630 m (5,350 ft)
- Time zone: UTC-5 (Colombia Standard Time)

Guayabal de Síquima, also known as "The Golden Gate of the Central Magdalena", is a municipality and town of Colombia in the department of Cundinamarca located in the Central Magdalena Province 69 km (43 mi) from Bogotá.

The principal town is located at 4°52’52” North and 74°28’10” West, in zone called Western Zone of the Eastern Mountains, which is characterized by sinuous mountains.

Guayabal de Síquima is bordered on the northeast by the municipality of Villeta, on the west by the municipality of Bituima, on the north by Albán and on the south by Anolaima.

== History ==
Guayabal de Síquima was founded in 1721 with the assignation of the Father Luis Calvo Vasallo as parish priest of the town. He began the construction of 22 houses of Bareque and 5 of mud wall stepped around the Principal Park.

In the year of 1739 Guayabal de Síquima was divided into four big zones Chiniata, named in honour of an ancient Indian leader or Cacique, El Trigo (the wheat), being this region where this grain was cultivated for the first time; Resguardo, in memory of which the natives called Muizane, meaning refuge or defense, and Manoa in memory of an ancient "cacique" of the region.
