= Simijaca Formation =

Geologic formation in Colombia

- Stratigraphic range: Cenomanian-Turonian; ~100–90 Ma
- Type: Geological formation
- Unit of: Villeta Group
- Underlies: La Frontera Formation
- Overlies: Chiquinquirá Sst., Churuvita Fm., Hiló Fm., Pacho Fm.
- Thickness: up to 693 m (2,270 ft)

Lithology
- Primary: Mudstone
- Other: Shale, sandstone, limestone

Location
- Coordinates: 5°29′15″N 73°50′55″W
- Region: Altiplano Cundiboyacense; Eastern Ranges, Andes
- Country: Colombia

Type section
- Named for: Simijaca
- Named by: Ulloa & Rodríguez
- Location: South of Simijaca
- Year defined: 1991
- Coordinates: 5°29′15″N 73°50′55″W
- Region: Cundinamarca, Boyacá
- Country: Colombia
- Thickness at type section: 432 metres (1,420 ft)
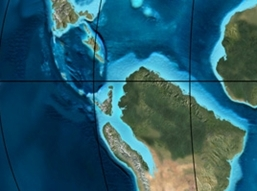
- Paleogeography of Northern South America; 90 Ma, by Ron Blakey

The Simijaca Formation (Spanish: Formación Simijaca, K_{2}S, Kss) is a geological formation of the Altiplano Cundiboyacense, Eastern Ranges of the Colombian Andes. The predominantly mudstone formation dates to the Late Cretaceous period; Turonian and Cenomanian epochs, and has a maximum thickness of 693 metres (2,274 ft).

== Etymology ==
The formation was defined and named in 1991 by Ulloa and Rodríguez after Simijaca, Cundinamarca.

== Description ==
=== Lithologies ===
The Simijaca Formation is characterised by a sequence of mudstones, grey and black shales with sandstone and limestone intercalations.

=== Stratigraphy and depositional environment ===
The Simijaca Formation conformably overlies the Chiquinquirá Sandstone, and the Hiló and Pacho Formations, and is overlain by the La Frontera Formation. The age has been estimated to be Turonian, or Cenomanian. Stratigraphically, the formation is time equivalent with the Chipaque Formation. The formation has been deposited in an open marine platform setting. The deposition is represented by a maximum flooding surface.

== Outcrops ==
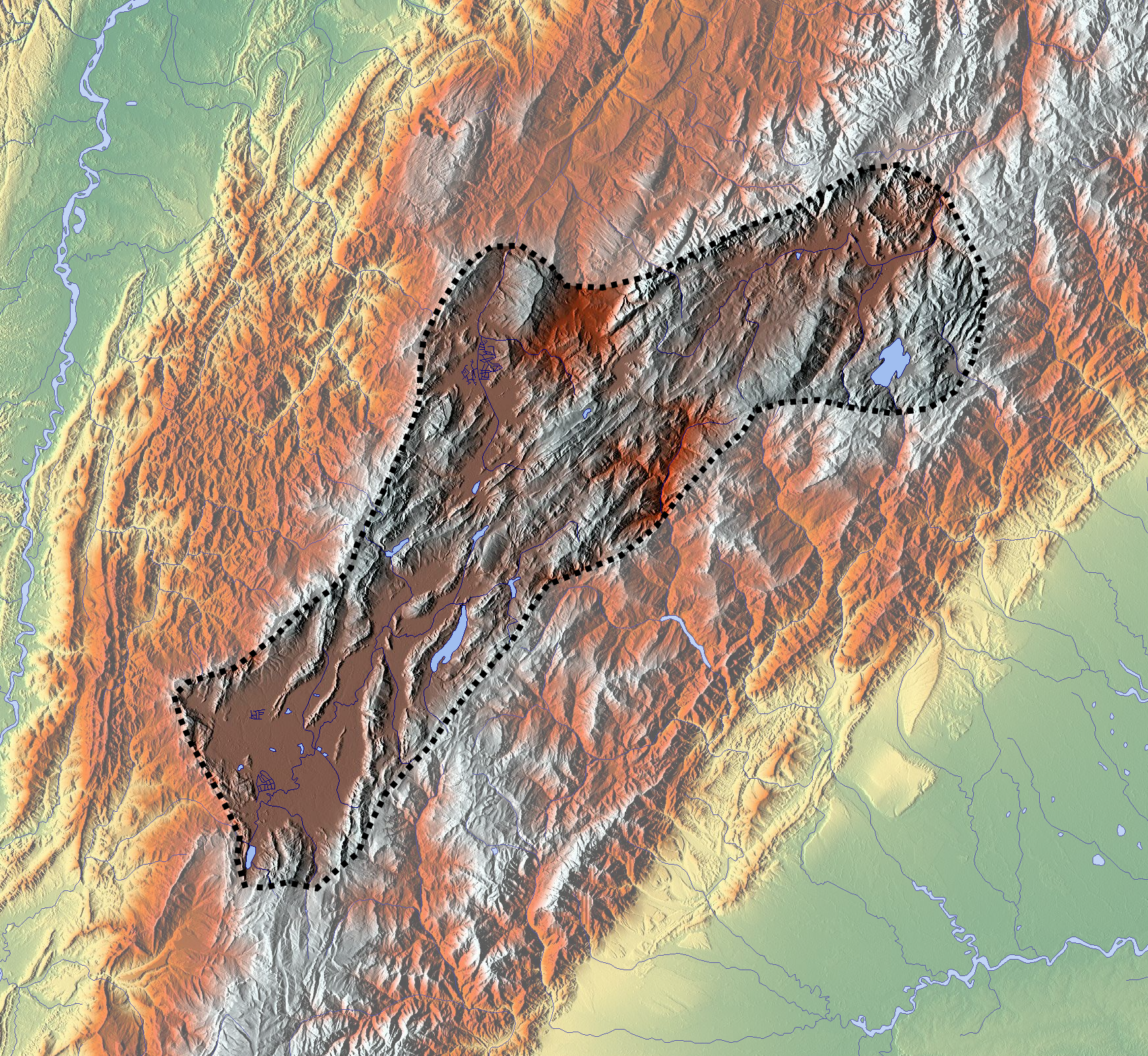
Type locality of the Simijaca Formation on the Altiplano Cundiboyacense

The Simijaca Formation is apart from its type locality in the Quebrada Don Lope, found at surface in the north of the Bogotá savanna, in the Tabio anticlinal, along the road Ubaté-Carmen de Carupa, at the western and eastern flanks of the Aponsentos-Chiquinquirá Synclinal, near Tena, south of Anolaima and Cachipay, and between Anapoima and Granada.

== See also ==
Geology of the Eastern Hills
Geology of the Ocetá Páramo
Geology of the Altiplano Cundiboyacense
