= Viotá =

- Municipality and town
- Flag Coat of arms

- Location of the municipality and town inside Cundinamarca Department of Colombia

- Location in Colombia
- Coordinates: 4°26′17″N 74°31′26″W
- Country: Colombia
- Department: Cundinamarca
- Elevation: 567 m (1,860 ft)

Population (Census 2018)
  - Total: 12,589
- Time zone: UTC-5 (Colombia Standard Time)

Viotá is a municipality and town of Colombia in the department of Cundinamarca.
