= Bituima =

- Municipality and town
- Flag Coat of arms

- Location of the municipality and town inside Cundinamarca Department of Colombia

- Location in Colombia
- Coordinates: 4°52′28″N 74°32′26″W
- Country: Colombia
- Department: Cundinamarca
- Elevation: 1,627 m (5,338 ft)
- Time zone: UTC-5 (Colombia Standard Time)

Bituima is a municipality and town of Colombia in the department of Cundinamarca.
