= Apulo =

- Municipality and town
- Flag

- Location of the municipality and town inside Cundinamarca Department of Colombia

- Location in Colombia
- Coordinates: 4°31′15″N 74°35′55″W
- Country: Colombia
- Department: Cundinamarca

Area
  - Total: 122 km^{2} (47 sq mi)
- Elevation: 420 m (1,380 ft)

Population (2015)
  - Total: 7,812
  - Density: 64.0/km^{2} (166/sq mi)
- Time zone: UTC-5 (Colombia Standard Time)

Apulo (previously called Rafael Reyes Municipality) is a Colombian town and municipality in the Cundinamarca Department. Its population was 7,812 people during the year 2015
