= Tilatá Formation =

Geological formation in the Colombian Andes

- Stratigraphic range: Early-Late Pliocene (Montehermosan-Uquian); ~5.3–2.7 Ma
- Type: Geological formation
- Sub-units: Tequendama Mb., Tibagota Mb., Guasca Mb.
- Underlies: Subachoque Formation
- Overlies: Guadalupe Gp. Guaduas Fm., Cacho Fm., Bogotá Fm., Regadera Fm.
- Thickness: up to 83 m (272 ft)

Lithology
- Primary: Conglomerate, sandstone
- Other: Shale

Location
- Coordinates: 5°05′56.9″N 73°42′49.7″W
- Region: Bogotá savanna, Altiplano Cundiboyacense; Eastern Ranges, Andes
- Country: Colombia

Type section
- Named for: Hacienta Tilatá
- Named by: Scheibe
- Location: Chocontá
- Year defined: 1933
- Coordinates: 5°05′56.9″N 73°42′49.7″W
- Region: Cundinamarca
- Country: Colombia

The Tilatá Formation (Spanish: Formación Tilatá, N_{1t}, Tpt) is a geological formation of the Bogotá savanna, Altiplano Cundiboyacense, Eastern Ranges of the Colombian Andes. The formation consists of coarse to very coarse conglomerates and sandstones. The Tilatá Formation dates to the Neogene period; Early to Late Pliocene epoch (Montehermosan to Uquian in the SALMA classification, from approximately 5.3 to 2.7 Ma), and has a maximum thickness of 83 metres (272 ft). The formation underlies the Quaternary sequence of alluvial, lacustrine and fluvial sediments of Lake Humboldt.

== Etymology ==
The formation was first defined and named by Scheibe in 1933 after the Hacienda Tilatá in Chocontá, near the Sisga Reservoir. Hubach (1957) elevated the Pisos de Tilatá to a formation.

== Description ==
=== Lithologies ===
The Tilatá Formation consists of medium to coarse grained sandstones and conglomerates with minor shale beds.

=== Stratigraphy and depositional environment ===
The Tilatá Formation is the lowermost of the lacustrine and alluvial sequence of the Bogotá savanna. It unconformably overlies the Cretaceous Guadalupe Group and the Paleogene Guaduas, Cacho, Bogotá, and Regadera Formations, and is overlain by the Quaternary Subachoque Formation of Lake Humboldt. Helmens and Van der Hammen (1995) subdivided the formation into three members; Tequendama, Tibagota (Lower Tilatá) and Guasca (Upper Tilatá). The age has been estimated to be Late Miocene to Late Pliocene based on fission track analysis and palynology, with reported ages between 5.3 and 2.7 Ma. The depositional environment has been interpreted as alluvial plains and alluvial fans, formed during the main phase of tectonic uplift of the Eastern Ranges in the Late Pliocene. Dutch geologist Salomon Kroonenberg, who studied the Neogene uplift of the Eastern Andes in Colombia, defines the main stage of uplift between six and four million years ago. Other Dutch geologists Helmens, Van der Hammen and Hooghiemstra have pushed back this uplift phase to between 4.5 and 3 Ma. The upper part of the Tilatá Formation is time-equivalent with the Chorrera Formation, outcropping in Subachoque and the main phase of explosive activity of the Paipa–Iza volcanic complex, active between 4.7 and 3.6 Ma.

== Outcrops ==
Type locality of the Tilatá Formation on the northeasternmost Bogotá savanna

The Tilatá Formation is found at its type locality in the synclinal of the Sisga Reservoir in Chocontá, in the Bogotá River valley, and along the road from Bogotá to Tunja.

== See also ==
Geology of the Eastern Hills
Geology of the Ocetá Páramo
Geology of the Altiplano Cundiboyacense
