= Cariris Velhos belt =

Belt of rocks in Brazil

The Cariris Velhos belt is a belt of rocks in Brazil that were deformed and metamorphosed in the Early Neoproterozoic. The belt runs from the Atlantic more than 700 kilometres (430 mi) inland in a SWW direction. The width of the belt varies from 100 to 50 kilometres (62 to 31 mi).

The Cariris Velhos belt lies intercalated in a mosaic with various Brasiliano cycle belts in the Borborema Province, a geologic province in Northeastern Brazil. The belt includes a series of orthogneisses, metavolcanic and metasedimentary rocks. It is not known if the plate tectonic events that led to the formation of the belts are related to the assembly of the supercontinent Rodinia.
