= Sunsás orogeny =

Ancient orogeny

The Sunsás orogeny was an ancient orogeny active during the Late Paleoproterozoic and Mesoproterozoic and currently preserved as the Sunsás orogen in the Amazonian Craton in South America. About 85% of the orogen is covered by Phanerozoic sediments. Among the remaining 15% of the orogen, which is exposed at surface, the best outcrops lie around the Bolivia-Brazil border. It is thought that the original orogen once spanned an area from Venezuela to Argentina and Paraguay. The western and southeastern fringes of the Sunsás orogen have been incorporated into the Andean orogeny and the Brasiliano orogeny respectively. The Sunsás orogeny was active during four separate phases:

- Santa Helena orogeny, 1465–1427 Ma (million years ago)
- Candeias orogeny, 1371–1319 Ma
- San Andrés orogeny, ca. 1275 Ma
- Nova Brasilândia orogeny, 1180–1110 Ma
