= Paipa-Iza volcanic complex =

Colombian volcanic field

Paipa–Iza volcanic complex
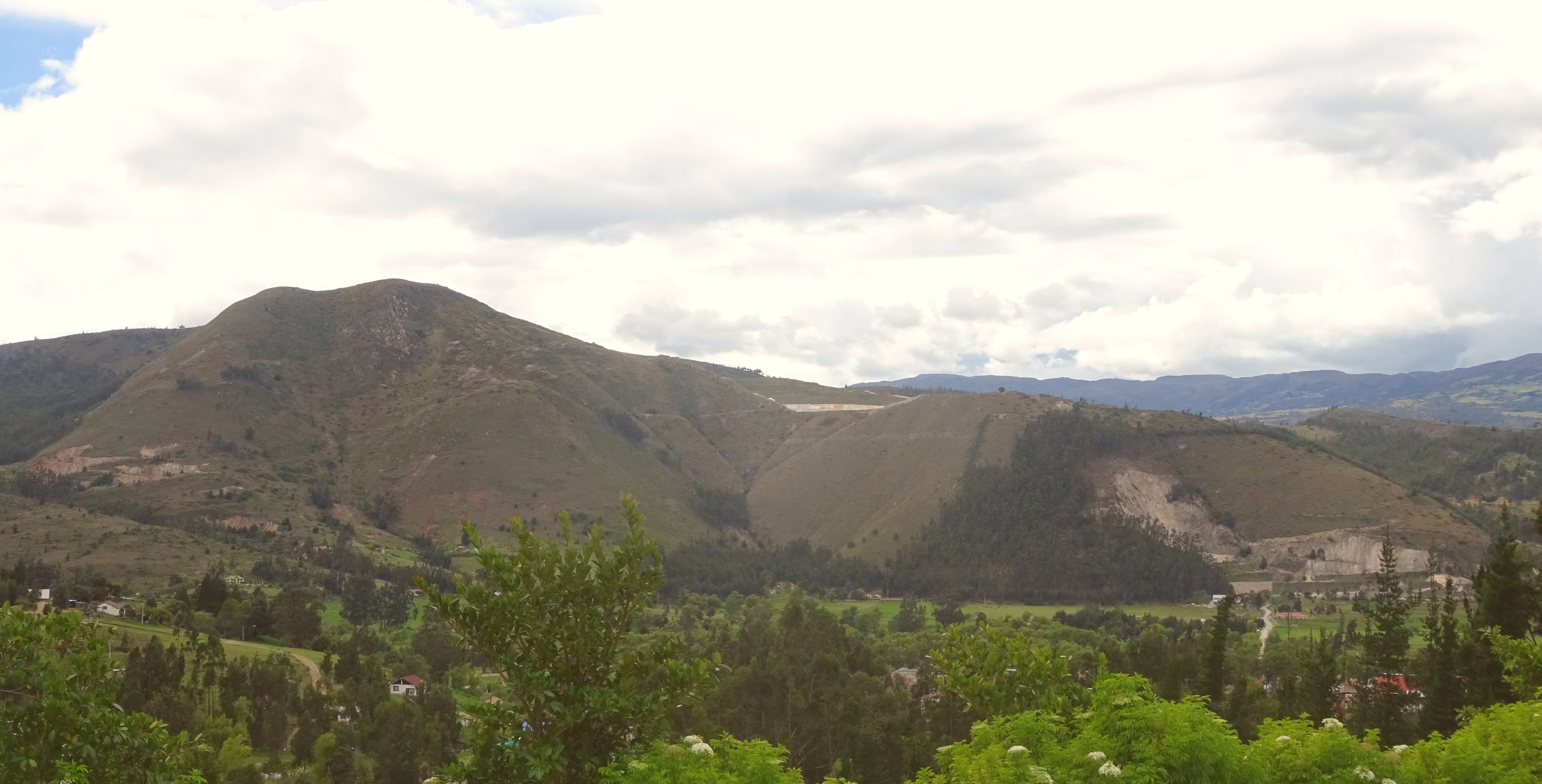
- View of Iza volcano from the east

Highest point
- Elevation: 2,500–2,770 m (8,200–9,090 ft)
- Parent peak: Altiplano Cundiboyacense
- Coordinates: 5°36′25.7″N 72°59′40.4″W

Naming
- Native name: Complejo volcánico de Paipa–Iza (Spanish)
- English translation: "cacique Paipa & place of healing"

Geography
- Location within Colombia
- Location: Paipa & Iza, Boyacá, Colombia
- Parent range: Eastern Ranges, Andes

Geology
- Rock age: Plio-Pleistocene
- Mountain type: Volcanic field
- Rock type(s): Porphyritic plagioclase and sanidine-rich rhyolites
- Volcanic belt: Andean Volcanic Belt; Northern Volcanic Zone
- Last eruption: Early Pleistocene

Climbing
- First ascent: Precolumbian
- Easiest route: Drive to Paipa or Iza
- Access: Partially restricted (quarries); Thermal baths touristic attraction

The Paipa–Iza volcanic complex is a volcanic field of Late Pliocene to Early Pleistocene age on the Altiplano Cundiboyacense in the Eastern Ranges of the Colombian Andes. It is the northernmost volcanic complex of the Andean Volcanic Belt with Fueguino in Tierra del Fuego, Chile, at the opposite end of the Andean mountain belt.

The complex, comprising mainly felsic extrusive volcanic rocks as rhyolites, also is the only confirmed volcanic province in the Eastern Ranges, with traces of probably contemporaneous explosive volcanic activity in the vicinity of Guatavita, Cundinamarca.

The Paipa-Iza volcanic field is important as a touristic site with thermal baths in both Paipa and Iza and is being studied for the potential of geothermal energy production and for the extraction of uranium in the area.

== Etymology ==
The names Paipa and Iza originate in Muysccubun, the language of the indigenous Muisca, who inhabited the Altiplano Cundiboyacense before the Spanish conquest. Paipa was the name of a cacique who served under cacique Tundama of Duitama and Iza means "place of healing".

== Geography ==
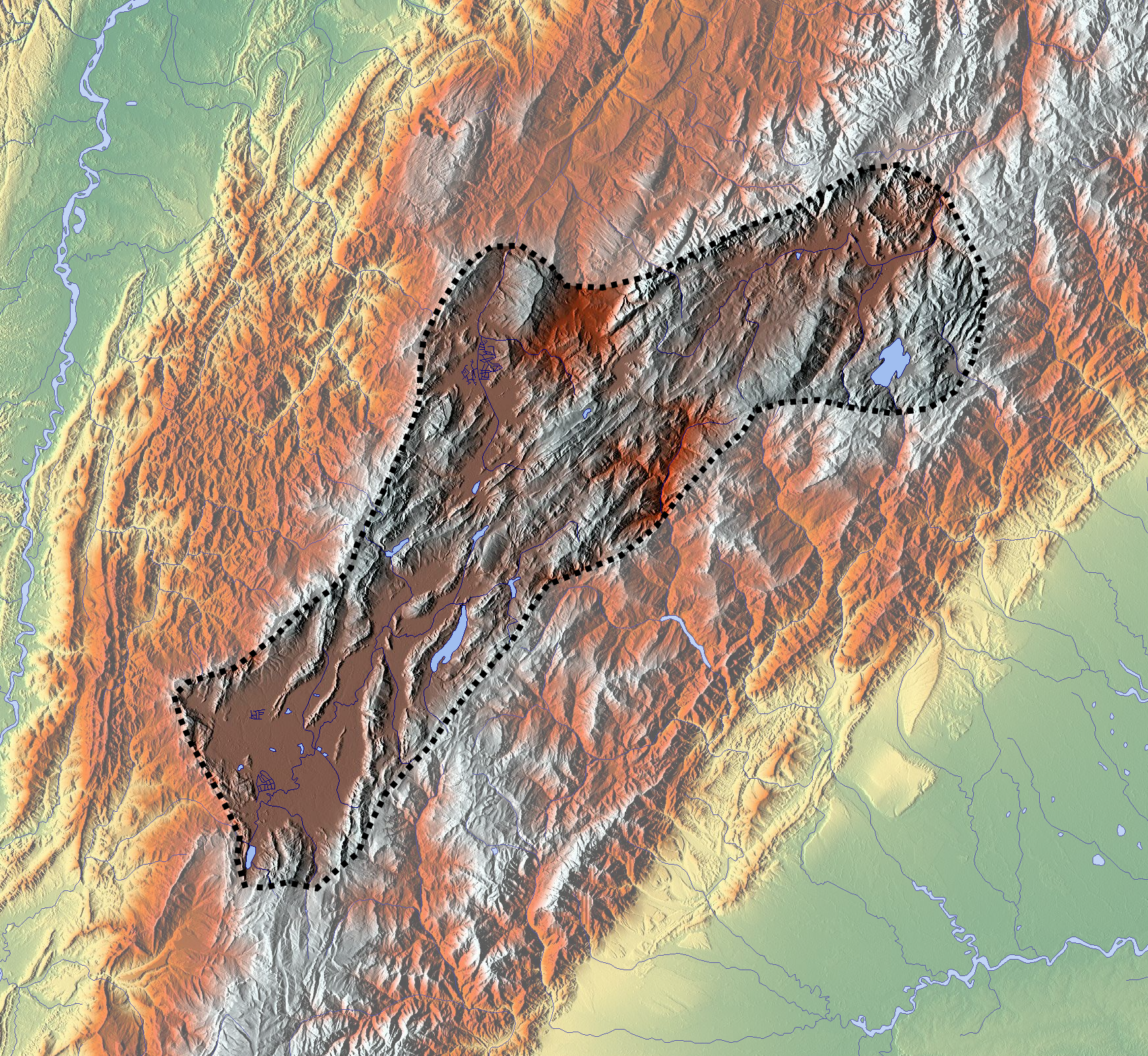
Paipa and Iza on the Altiplano Cundiboyacense

The Paipa–Iza volcanic complex is located in the northern part of the Altiplano Cundiboyacense at altitudes between 2,500 and 2,770 metres (8,200 and 9,090 ft). The northwestern part of the complex is situated in the municipality Paipa and the southeastern part in Iza, both belonging to the department of Boyacá.

=== Climate ===
Paipa - 2525 m

Climate chart (precipitation, max. and min. temperature)
| J | F | M | A | M | J | J | A | S | O | N | D |
| 29 21 7 | 44 22 8 | 65 22 8 | 123 21 10 | 124 20 10 | 61 19 9 | 46 19 8 | 50 20 8 | 68 20 8 | 151 20 9 | 99 20 9 | 51 21 8 |
- █ Average max. and min. temperatures in °C
- █ Precipitation totals in mm
- Source: Climate-data.org - Paipa
Imperial conversion
| J | F | M | A | M | J | J | A | S | O | N | D |
| 1.1 70 45 | 1.7 71 47 | 2.6 71 47 | 4.8 69 49 | 4.9 68 49 | 2.4 67 48 | 1.8 67 46 | 2 67 46 | 2.7 68 47 | 5.9 67 48 | 3.9 69 48 | 2 69 46 |
- █ Average max. and min. temperatures in °F
- █ Precipitation totals in inches

== Paipa–Iza volcanic complex ==
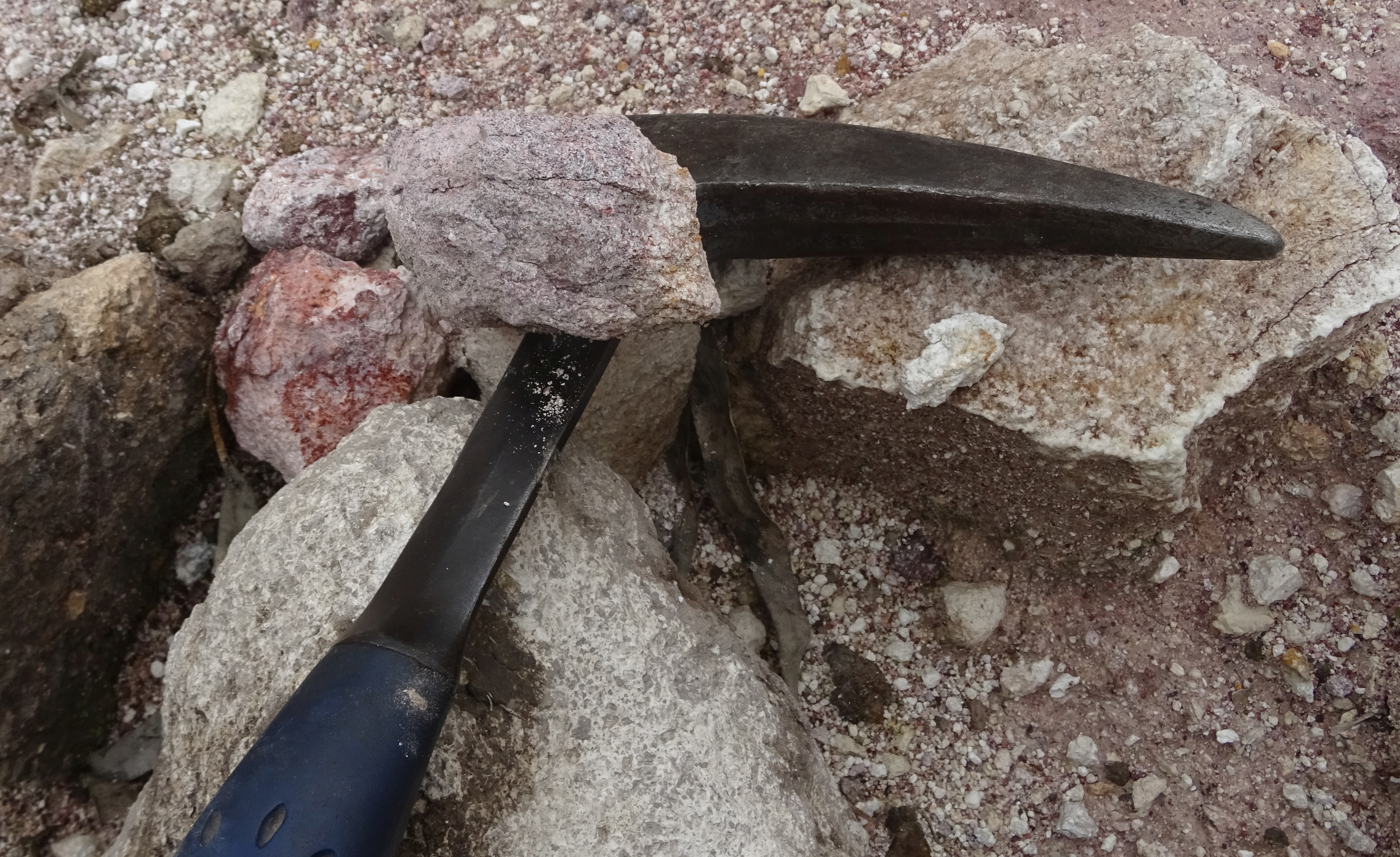
Rhyolite from Holcim dome, Iza

The complex was active from the late Pliocene, around 2.7 Ma, until the earliest Pleistocene, around 2.3 Ma.

The complex at Iza consists of two domes; Domo Holcim with 0.67 square kilometres (7,200,000 sq ft) and Domo Los Sauces 0.12 square kilometres (30 acres) in size. They consist of porphyritic rhyolites with sanidine and plagioclase as dominant mineral groups and abundant xenoliths of sedimentary rock and in minor quantities volcanic or metamorphic fragments. The overall rock composition is very felsic and comprises biotites and amphiboles as opaque minerals.

== Geothermal energy ==
The complex is studied for the potential of geothermal energy production.

== Resources ==
The complex is studied for the potential of uranium mining.

== See also ==
- List of volcanoes in Colombia
- Altiplano Cundiboyacense
  - Bogotá savanna
