= Chicamocha =

Chicamocha may refer to:

- Chicamocha Canyon, second-largest canyon in the world, cut by the
- Chicamocha River, Boyacá and Santander Departments, central Colombia
- Chicamocha National Park (PANACHI), national park surrounding the canyon
- Chicamocha National Park cable car, cable car in the national park
- Chicamocha Fault, seismic fault crossing the canyon
- Chicamocha Schist, Late Cambrian geologic formation outcropping in the canyon
- Alto Chicamocha, province in the upper course of the river
- Clínica Chicamocha, hospital in Bucaramanga
