= Chicamocha Canyon =

Canyon in Colombia

- Cañón del Chicamocha
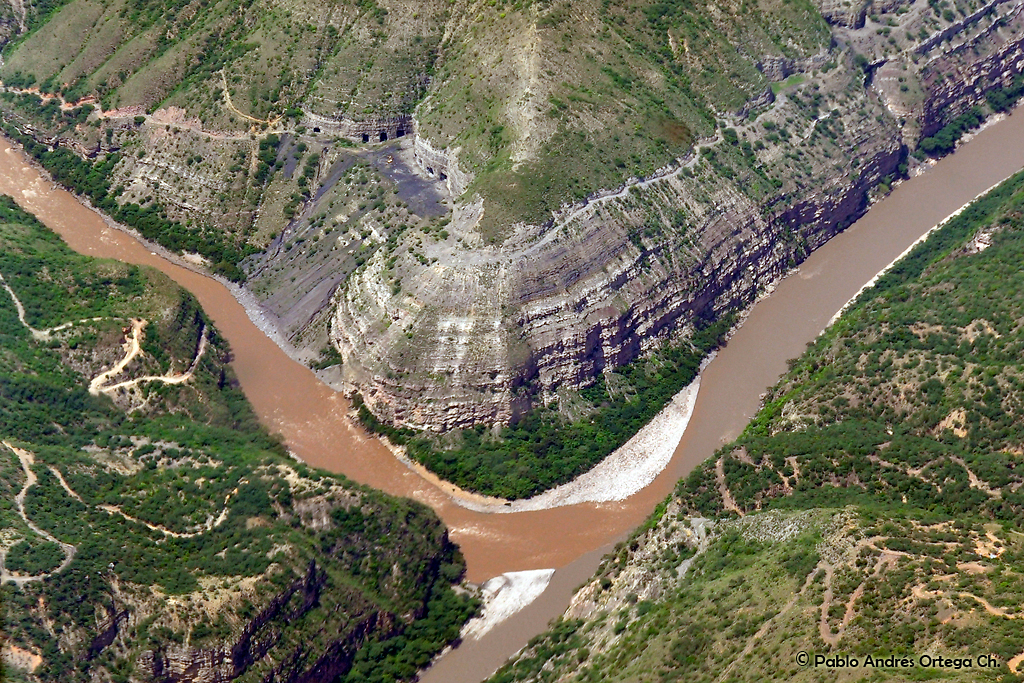
- Chicamocha Canyon at the confluence of the Suárez and Chicamocha Rivers, and the Sogamoso River

- Location within Colombia
- Floor elevation: 900–1,900 m (3,000–6,200 ft)
- Length: 227 km (141 mi) NW-SE
- Area: 108,000 ha (270,000 acres)
- Depth: 2,000 m (6,600 ft)

Geology
- Type: River canyon
- Age: Oligocene-recent

Geography
- Country: Colombia
- State: Boyacá and Santander
- Region: Andean; South American plate and Chibcha terrane
- District: Alto Chicamocha
- Population centers: Soatá, Capitanejo, Cepitá, Pescadero, Jordán, Betulia, Girón
- Borders on: Mesa de Los Santos (west, north, east); Altiplano Cundiboyacense (south)
- Coordinates: 6°45′N 73°02′W
- Traversed by: National Route 45A
- Rivers: Chicamocha River; Suárez River; Sogamoso River
- Interactive map of Chicamocha Canyon

The Chicamocha Canyon (/ˌtʃiːkəˈmoʊtʃə/ CHEE-kə-MOH-chə, Spanish: Cañón del Chicamocha) is a steep sided canyon carved by the Chicamocha River in Colombia. With a maximum depth of 2,000 metres (6,600 ft), an area of 108,000 hectares (270,000 acres) and a length of 227 kilometres (141 mi), the canyon is the second-largest worldwide. The canyon is situated in the departments of Boyacá and Santander, stretching from Soatá in the southeast to Girón and Betulia in the northwest.

The canyon is a major tourist attraction at approximately 55 kilometres (34 mi) from the capital of Santander, Bucaramanga and close to backpacker destination San Gil. National Route 45A, connecting Bogotá with Bucaramanga, between San Gil and Piedecuesta crosses the canyon and offers spectacular sights on both sides of the Chicamocha River. The heavy truck traffic through the canyon, with frequent accidents and very restricted access can lead to long traffic jams. The canyon is currently administered by Chicamocha National Park (Spanish: Parque Nacional del Chicamocha, PANACHI). The Chicamocha Canyon started forming in the Early Oligocene, when Colombia was undergoing a tectonically active phase of the Andean orogeny. The Sierra Nevada de Santa Marta was emplaced during the Eocene and active subduction of the Caribbean and Coiba plates caused uplift in the Eastern Ranges. The climatological changes of the Oligocene, with a general global cooling trend, strong uplift and changing and restricted weather patterns led to the formation of the early Chicamocha Canyon. Ongoing uplift in the Miocene brought about a larger and higher hinterland for the drainage basin of the Chicamocha River. In the Pleistocene, at the southern extension near Soatá, a paleolake, Lake Soatá formed, which was inhabited by the elephant-like Notiomastodon (described as Haplomastodon waringi found in the Soatá Formation in the canyon.

The canyon is one of the treasures of Colombia.

In 2009, the canyon was preselected for the election of the 7 natural wonders. The Chicamocha canyon was finally located in the Top 77 of the Natural Wonders.

Since 2013, a yearly set of running contests, the Chicamocha Canyon Race, are held around the canyon.

== Etymology ==
The name Chicamocha in the Guane language of the Muisca means "silver thread on a full moon night in the mountain range".

== Description ==
Legend:
Start of Chicamocha Canyon near Soatá
River crossing by 45A
Confluence of Suárez and Chicamocha Rivers near Jordán
End of Chicamocha Canyon between Betulia and Girón
Confluence Sogamoso with Magdalena River
Barichara
Bucaramanga-Santa Marta Fault (BSF)

Chicamocha Canyon has a length of 227 kilometres (141 mi), extends over 108,000 hectares (270,000 acres), and a maximum depth of 2,000 metres (6,600 ft), making it the second-largest canyon in the world. The canyon was formed in a period since about 30 million years ago. The southern extension near Soatá, contained a Pleistocene paleolake, Lake Soatá. In the Soatá Formation, fossils of this period have been found. The canyon is currently administered by Chicamocha National Park.

The canyon is the result of the erosion caused by the Chicamocha River, which erosional forces created deep cliffs on both sides. The Chicamocha Canyon begins near the town of Soatá in the Department of Boyacá and flows mainly through Santander, extending all the way to the municipality of Lebrija. This geographic feature was caused by the movement of tectonic plates that extend from the Chicamocha Canyon to other regions such as Bucaramanga. South of Zapatoca, the Chicamocha River and the Suárez River form the Sogamoso River. The canyon represents the southern boundary of the Mesa de Los Santos, a seismically active area known as the Bucaramanga Nest.

The climate in the highest parts of the canyon near Soatá is cold and humid, changing into a dry and hotter climate near Capitanejo. The lowest areas in the northwest at around 900 metres (3,000 ft) elevation have the driest and hottest climate. The vegetation of the canyon north of San Gil is of a dry tropical forest.

=== History ===
The region of the Chicamocha Canyon before the Spanish conquest was inhabited by the Guane.

=== Geology ===
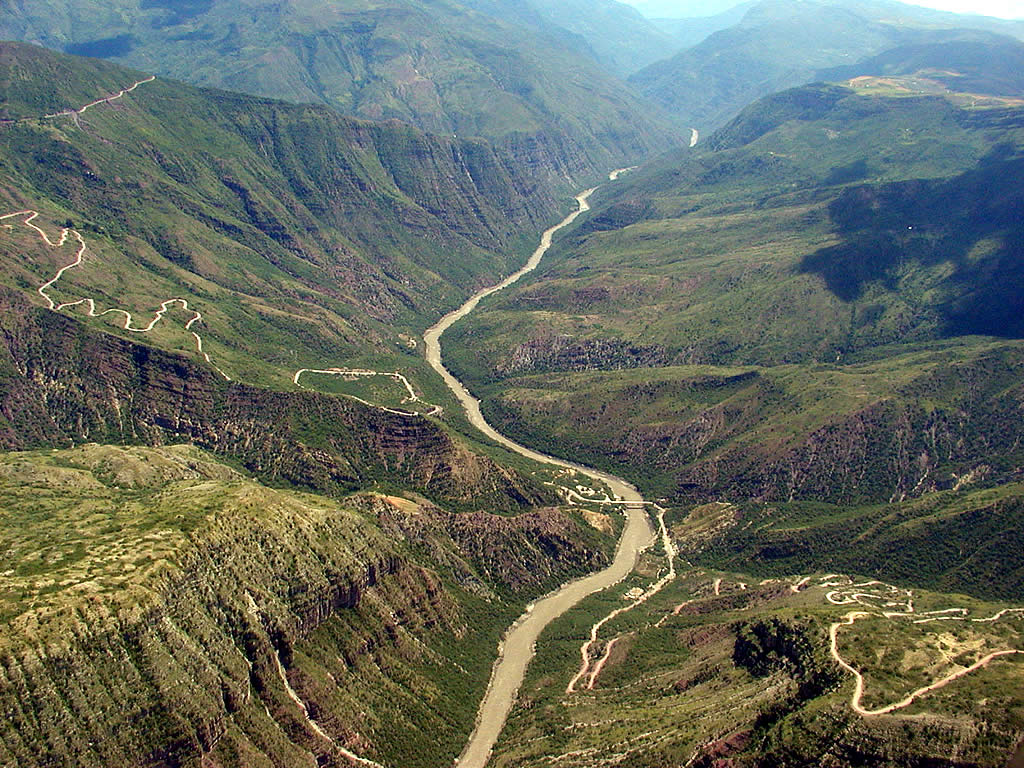
View of the Sogamoso River in the Chicamocha Canyon, Girón to Zapatoca.

Chicamocha Canyon traverses formations of Precambrian to Pleistocene age. In the southeasternmost part, the Soatá Formation forms the youngest geological unit, deposited in terraces surrounding Lake Soatá. Lake Soatá was probably close to 400 metres (1,300 ft) deep. The paleolake was approximately 30 kilometres (19 mi) long and widest between Soatá and Boavita at 7 kilometres (4.3 mi). Fossils of Haplomastodon waringi, Neochoerus sp. and Odocoileus cf. salinae have been found here. The fossil content is fragmentary.

The canyon flanks contain outcrops of the Neoproterozoic Bucaramanga Gneiss, the Cambro-Ordovician sequence of Late Cambrian Chicamocha Schist, named after the canyon, and San Pedro Phyllites. This sequence was formerly called 'Silgará Formation'. Following a hiatus, typical for Colombian geology spanning the Silurian, the Devonian Floresta Formation unconformably overlies the Lower Paleozoic section. The Jurassic Pescadero Quartzmonzonite, Jordán, and San Gil Formations, and the Cretaceous Tibú-Mercedes, Aguardiente, Capacho, La Luna, Paja, Rosablanca, and El Tambor Formations overly the Paleozoic succession.

Near Jordán, the Las Cruces-Curití, Los Santos and Aratoca Faults cross-cut and form the canyon, around Curití, the canyon is cut by the Bucaramanga-Santa Marta Fault and near Covarachía the Chicamocha Fault forms the trace of the canyon.

Near Barichara on the flanks of the canyon, gypsum is mined.

== Gallery ==
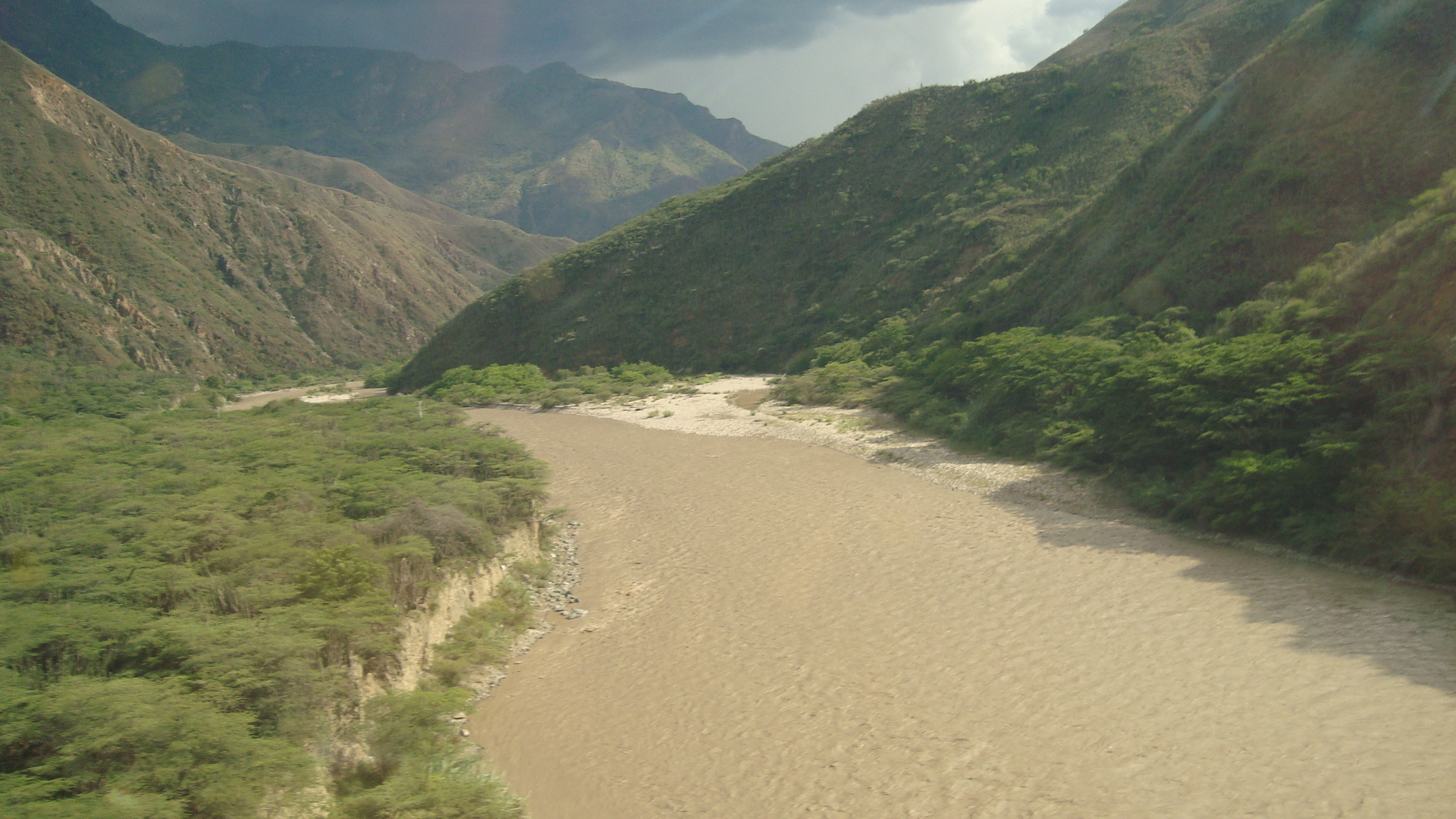
Chicamocha River

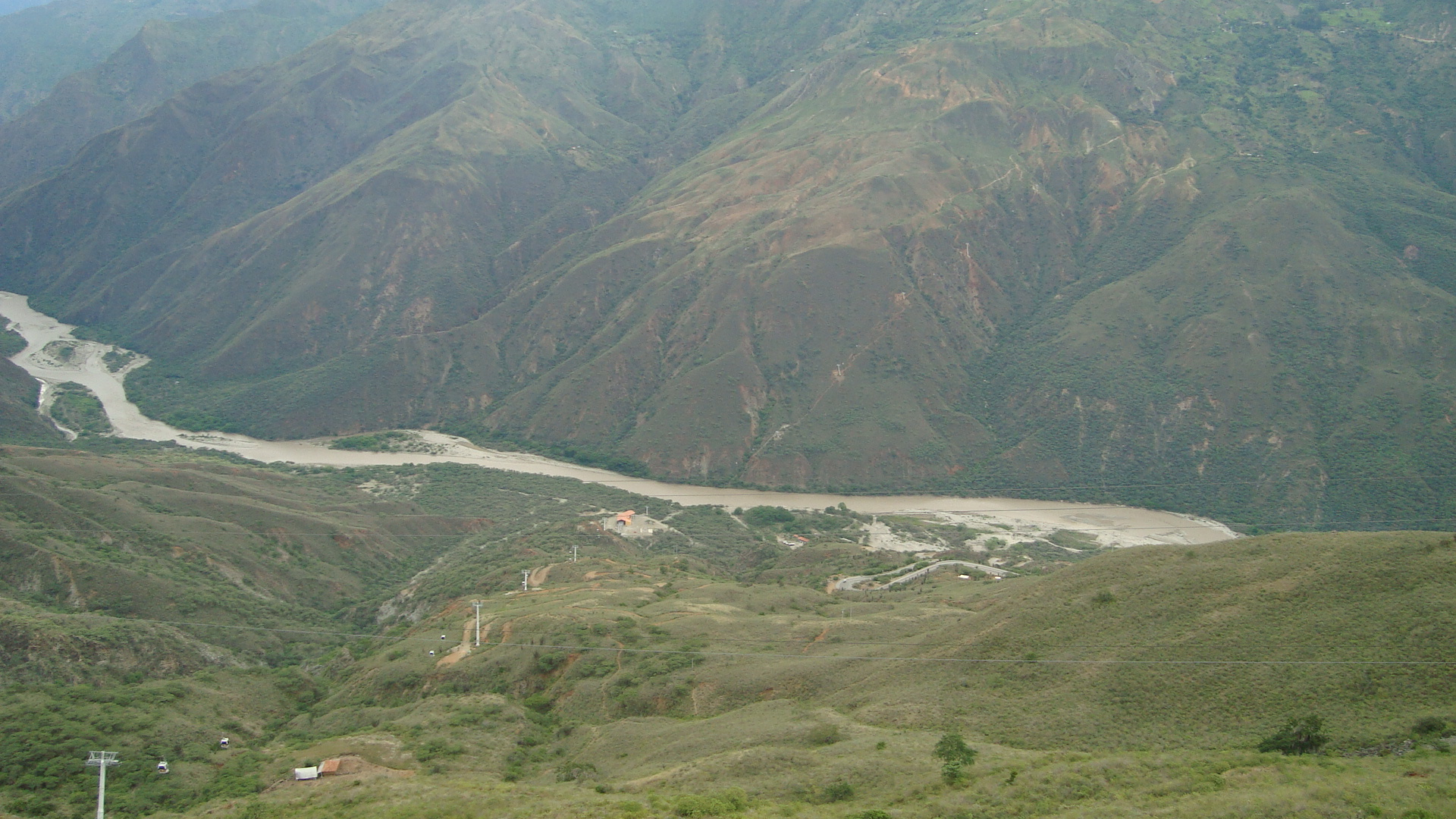
Chicamocha National Park cable car

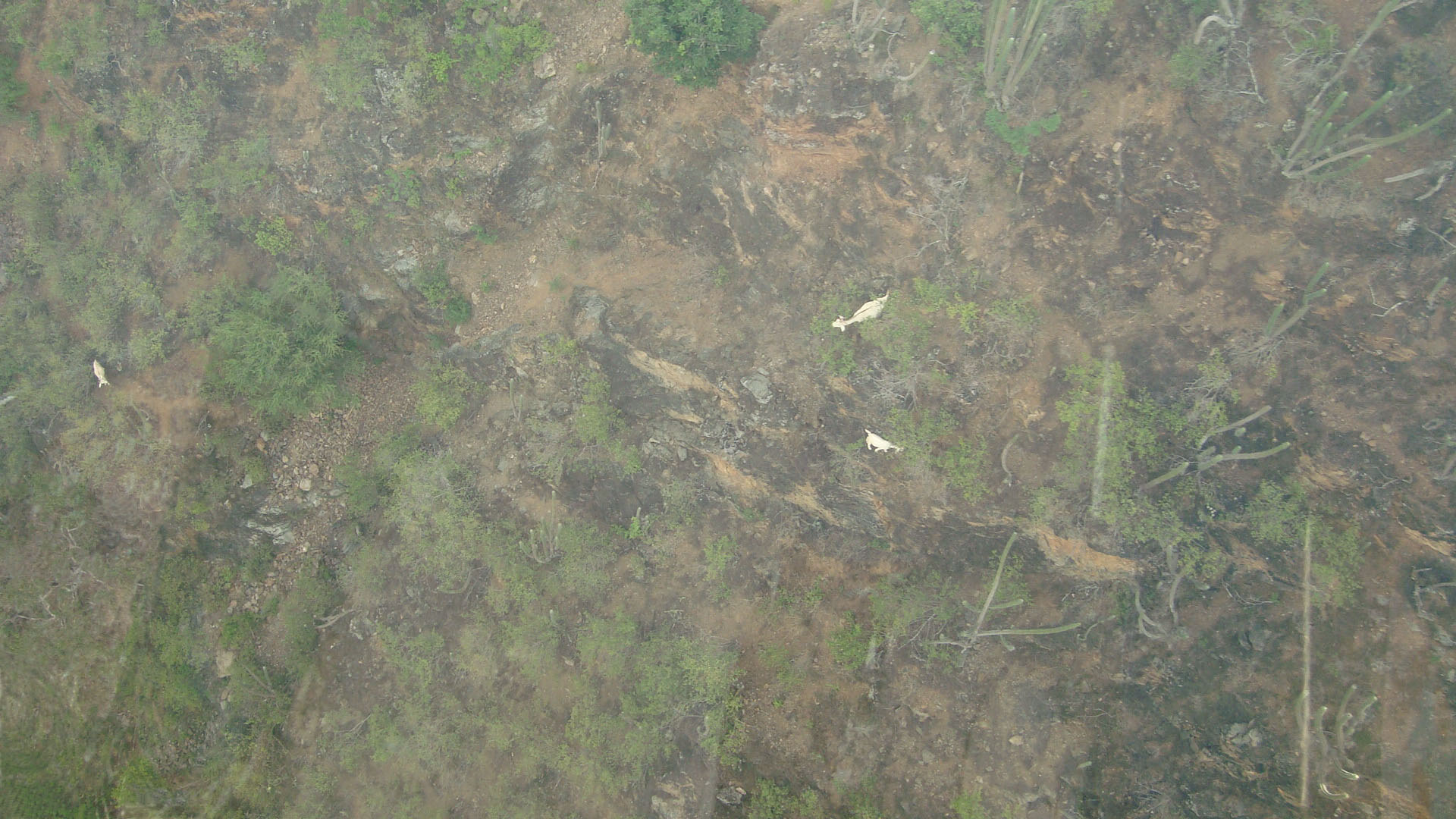
Fauna

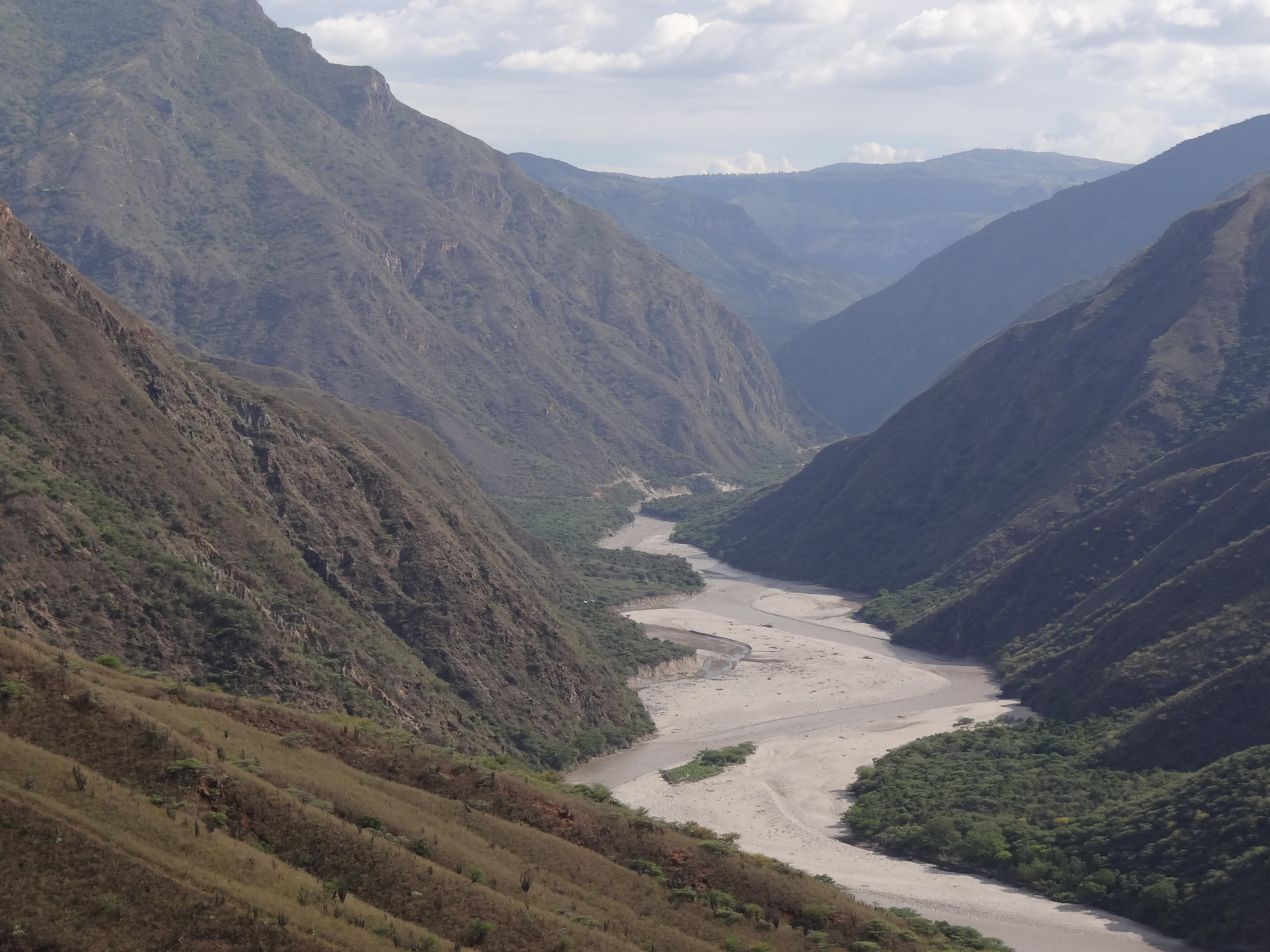

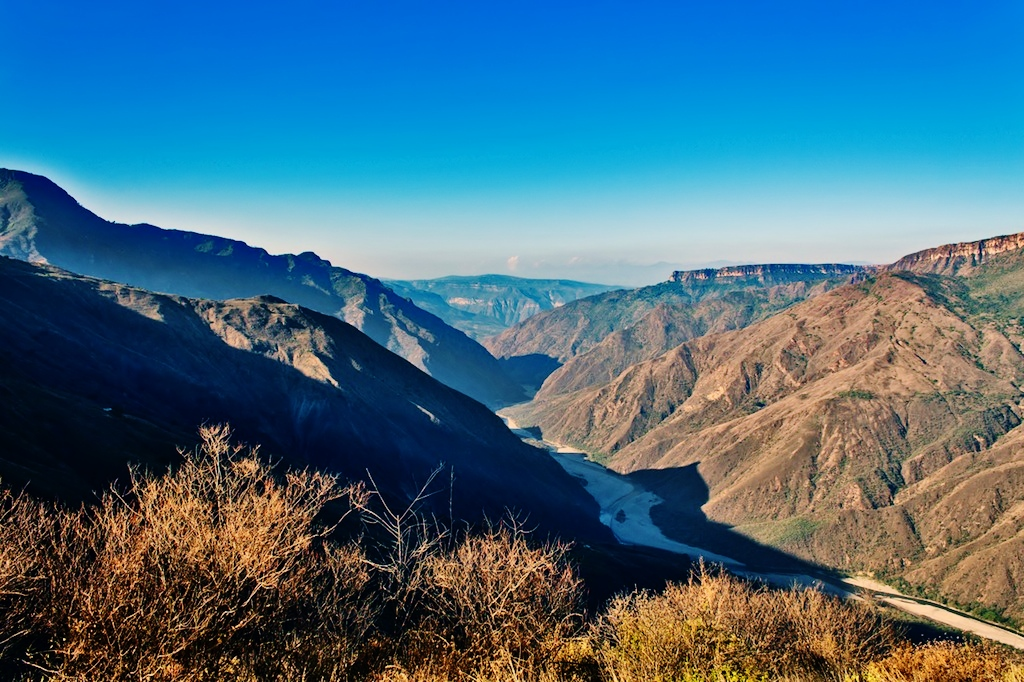

=== Panorama ===
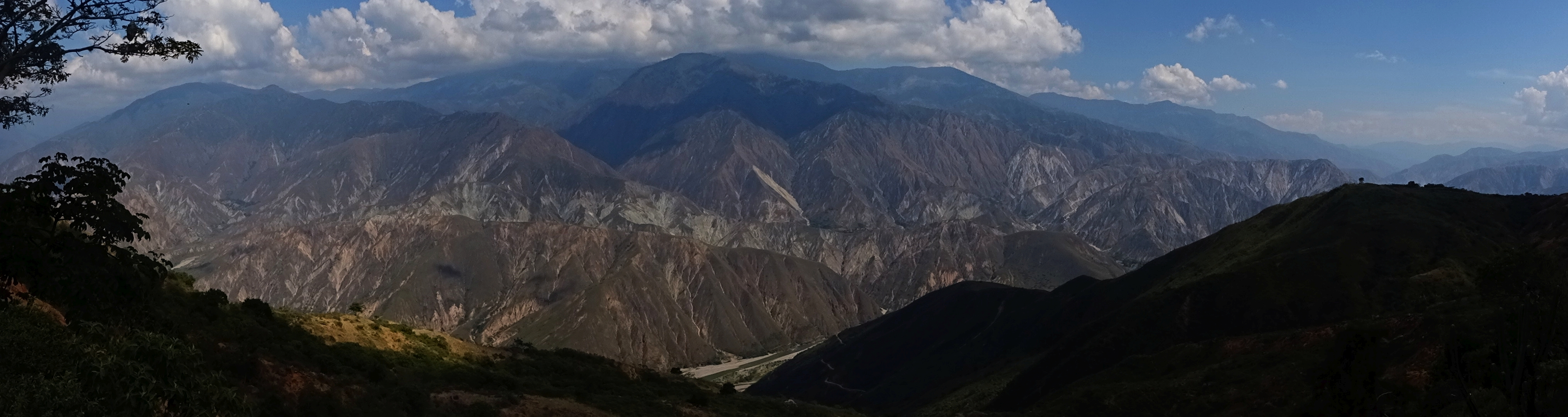
Panorama of the Chicamocha Canyon

== See also ==
- Chicamocha National Park
- Geology of Colombia
- Tourism in Colombia
- List of canyons
