= Soatá Formation =

Geological formation in the Colombian Andes

- Stratigraphic range: Late Pleistocene; ~0.0475–0.0388 Ma
- Type: Geological formation
- Underlies: Holocene sediments of the Chicamocha River
- Overlies: Capacho Formation
- Area: ~130 km^{2} (50 sq mi)
- Thickness: up to 30.8 m (101 ft)

Lithology
- Primary: Shale
- Other: Conglomerate, siltstone

Location
- Coordinates: 6°18′00″N 72°39′46″W
- Region: Altiplano Cundiboyacense; Eastern Ranges, Andes
- Country: Colombia
- Extent: ~30 km × 7 km (18.6 mi × 4.3 mi)

Type section
- Named for: Soatá
- Named by: Villarroel et al.
- Location: Portugalete, Soatá
- Year defined: 2001
- Coordinates: 6°18′00″N 72°39′46″W
- Approximate paleocoordinates: 6.3°N 72.5°W
- Region: Boyacá
- Country: Colombia
- Thickness at type section: 30.8 m (101 ft)
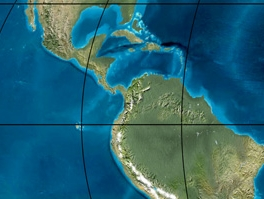
- Paleogeography of the Pleistocene

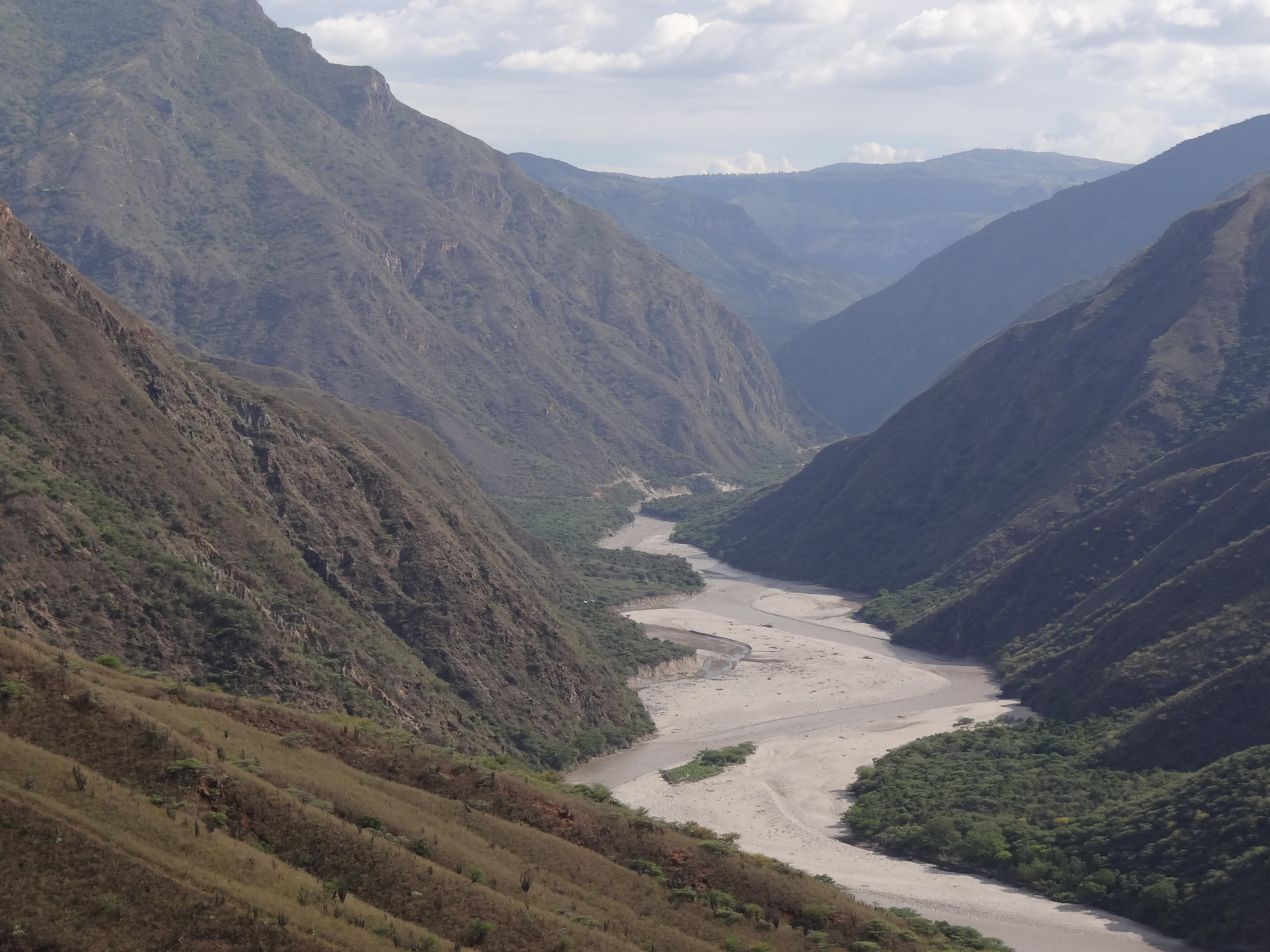
The Chicamocha River, seen here farther downstream at the Chicamocha Canyon, heavily eroded the former Pleistocene terraces of the Soatá Formation

The Soatá Formation (Spanish: Formación Soatá) is a geological formation of the northern Altiplano Cundiboyacense, Eastern Ranges of the Colombian Andes. The formation consists mainly of shales with conglomerates and dates to the Quaternary period; Late Pleistocene epoch. The heavily eroded formation has a maximum measured thickness of 30.8 metres (101 ft). It contains the lacustrine and fluvio-glacial sediments of elongated paleolake Soatá, that existed on the Altiplano in the valley of the Chicamocha River.

Fossils of the gomphothere Haplomastodon waringi, the capibara Neochoerus sp. and the deer species Odocoileus cf. salinae have been found in the Soatá Formation.

Knowledge about the formation has been provided by Colombian geologists Carlos Villarroel, Jorge Brieva and others.

== Etymology ==
The formation was first proposed and named after Soatá by Villarroel et al. in 2001. The type locality is defined near Portugalete, Soatá.

== Regional setting ==
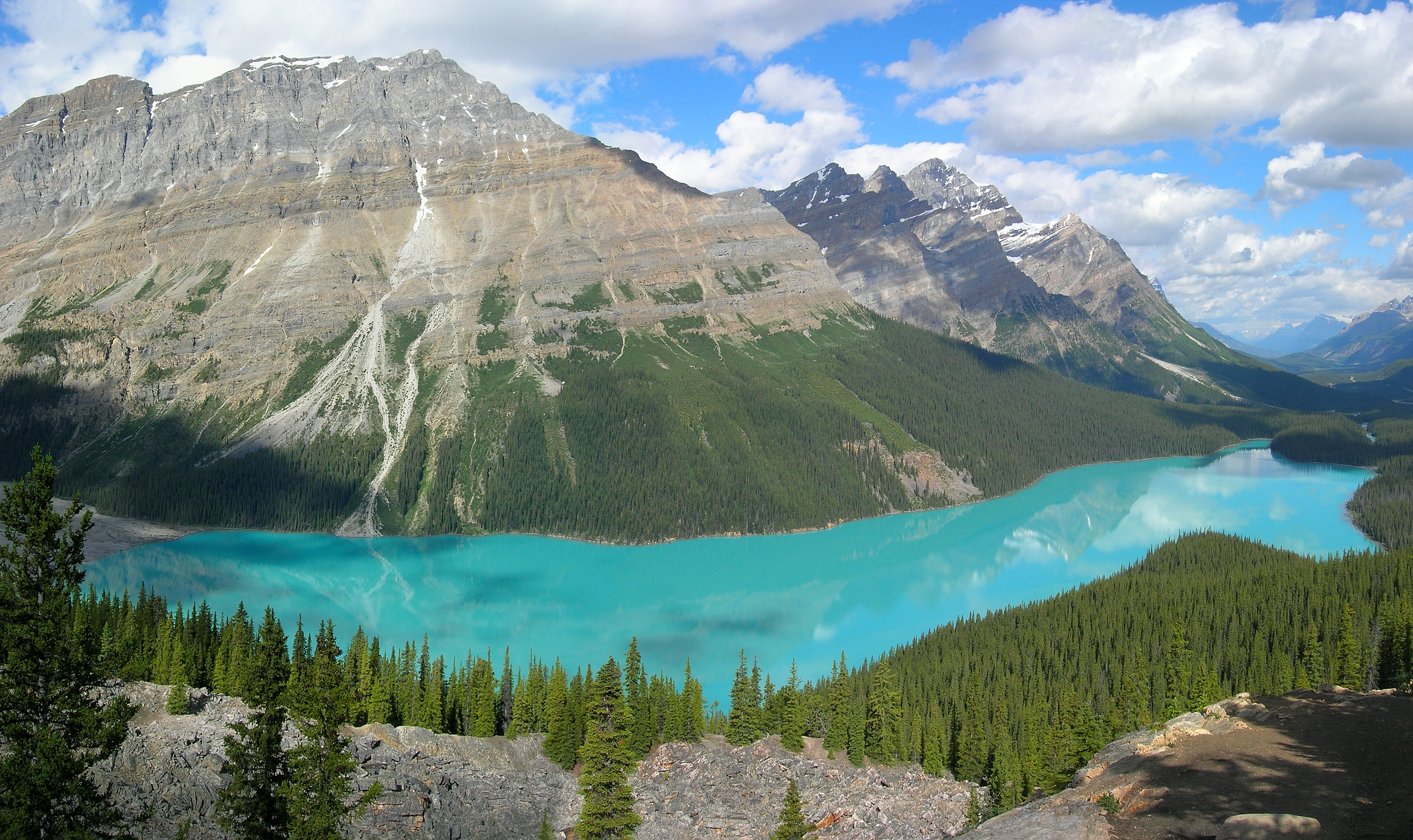
The Soatá Formation was deposited in a glacial lacustrine environment, in a narrow elongated deep paleolake

The Altiplano Cundiboyacense, in the Eastern Ranges of the Colombian Andes, was formed late in the regional uplift of the Andean orogeny. It is estimated that the main stage of uplift happened during the Plio-Pleistocene. The Western and Central Ranges were submerged much earlier, leaving a corridor to the Caribbean in the Neogene.

The compression in the Andean orogenic belt caused the formation of fold and thrust belts in the Eastern Ranges, where Cretaceous and Jurassic normal faults were inverted as thrust faults lifting up the Paleozoic (Floresta and Cuche Formations), Mesozoic and Paleogene strata. A hiatus existed on the Altiplano between the Late Eocene and Late Miocene, in several parts of the Altiplano continuing until the Pleistocene.

During the glacials and interglacials of the Pleistocene ("ice ages"), several paleolakes formed on the Altiplano Cundiboyacense, of which Lake Humboldt on the Bogotá savanna was the most extensive (approximately 4,500 square kilometres (1,700 sq mi)). Rivers were restricted during the drier glacial periods and the vegetation changed from páramo to Andean forest between the glacials and stadials and interglacials and interstadials.

== Description ==
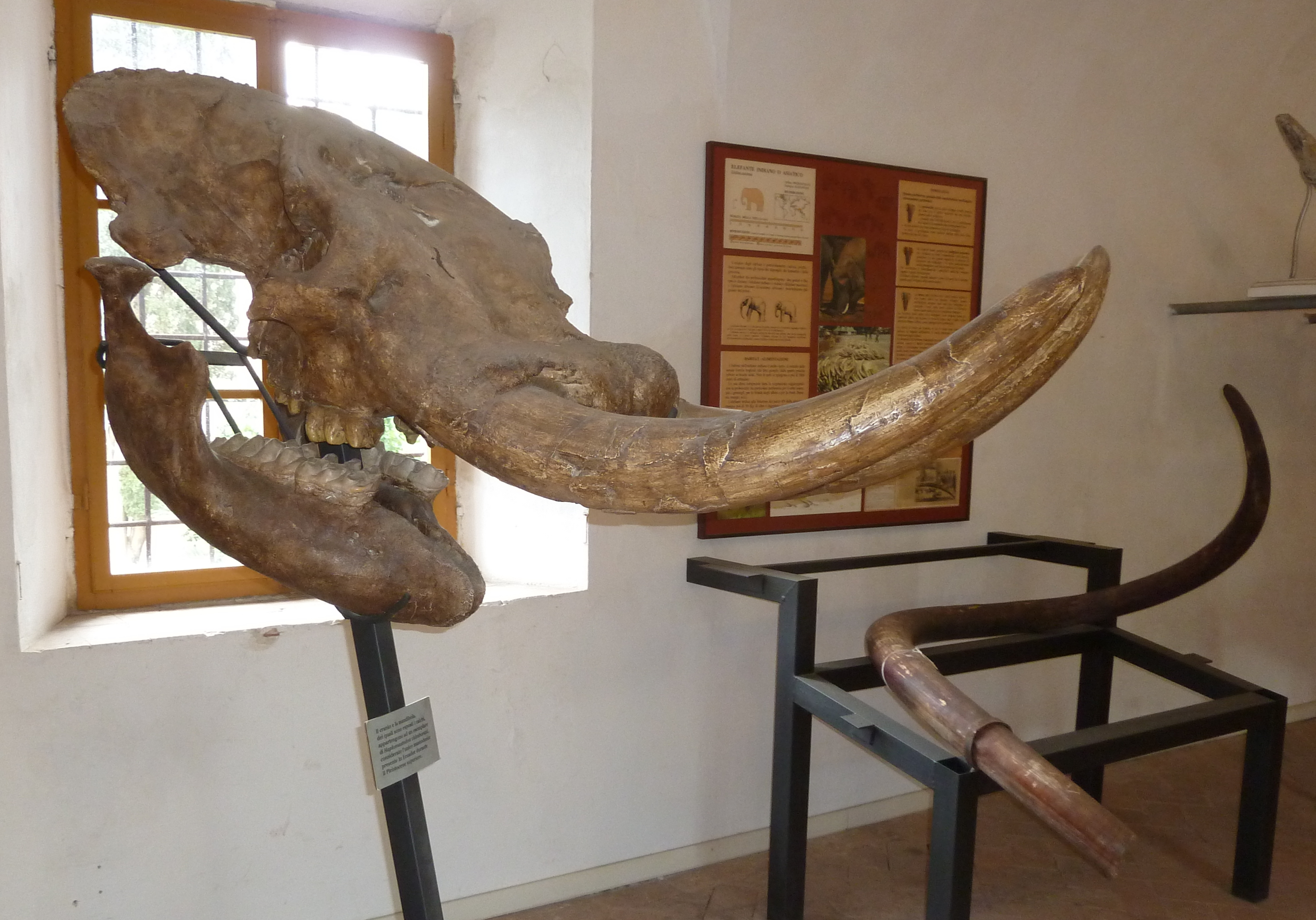
Fossils of the gomphothere Haplomastodon waringi were found in the Soatá Formation

=== Lithologies ===
The Soatá Formation consists of whitish calcareous claystones and sandy siltstones with plagioclase, hematite, zircon, green and reddish biotite, hornblende and crystalline calcite in its upper, older terrace. This unit also contains foraminifera and fragments of shells.

The middle, younger unit is composed of basal greyish claystones with non-uniform matrix-supported conglomerates at the upper section. The uppermost layer contains siltstones, probably of volcaniclastic origin.

The youngest sediments are found deepest in the basin and consist of claystones and greenish matrix-supported conglomerates. Rootlets and mammal fossils are more abundant in this layer.

=== Stratigraphy ===
The Soatá Formation unconformably overlies the Cretaceous Capacho Formation, and is overlain by the Holocene infill sediments of the Chicamocha River, the course of which severely eroded and fragmented the Soatá formation. The formation is subdivided into three units of different lithological character and sedimentary dip in a terrace setting. The Soatá Formation is time-equivalent with the upper part of the Sabana Formation on the Bogotá savanna and the Chinauta deposits near Fusagasugá in the southwest of the Altiplano. Two samples were analysed for radiometric dating and provided ages of 45,900 ± 1,600 and 39,600 ± 800 years BP. This corresponds to the Chicagota interstadial and the Tagua stadial, when the glaciations were at their maximum extent.

=== Depositional environment ===
The depositional environment has been interpreted as lacustrine (Lake Soatá) and fluvio-deltaic. Contrasting with the wide and shallow Lake Humboldt on the Bogotá savanna, Lake Soatá was probably close to 400 metres (1,300 ft) deep. The paleolake was approximately 30 kilometres (19 mi) long and widest between Soatá and Boavita at 7 kilometres (4.3 mi).

=== Fossil content ===
In the Soatá Formation, fossils of Haplomastodon waringi, Neochoerus sp. and Odocoileus cf. salinae have been found. The fossil content is fragmentary.

== Outcrops ==
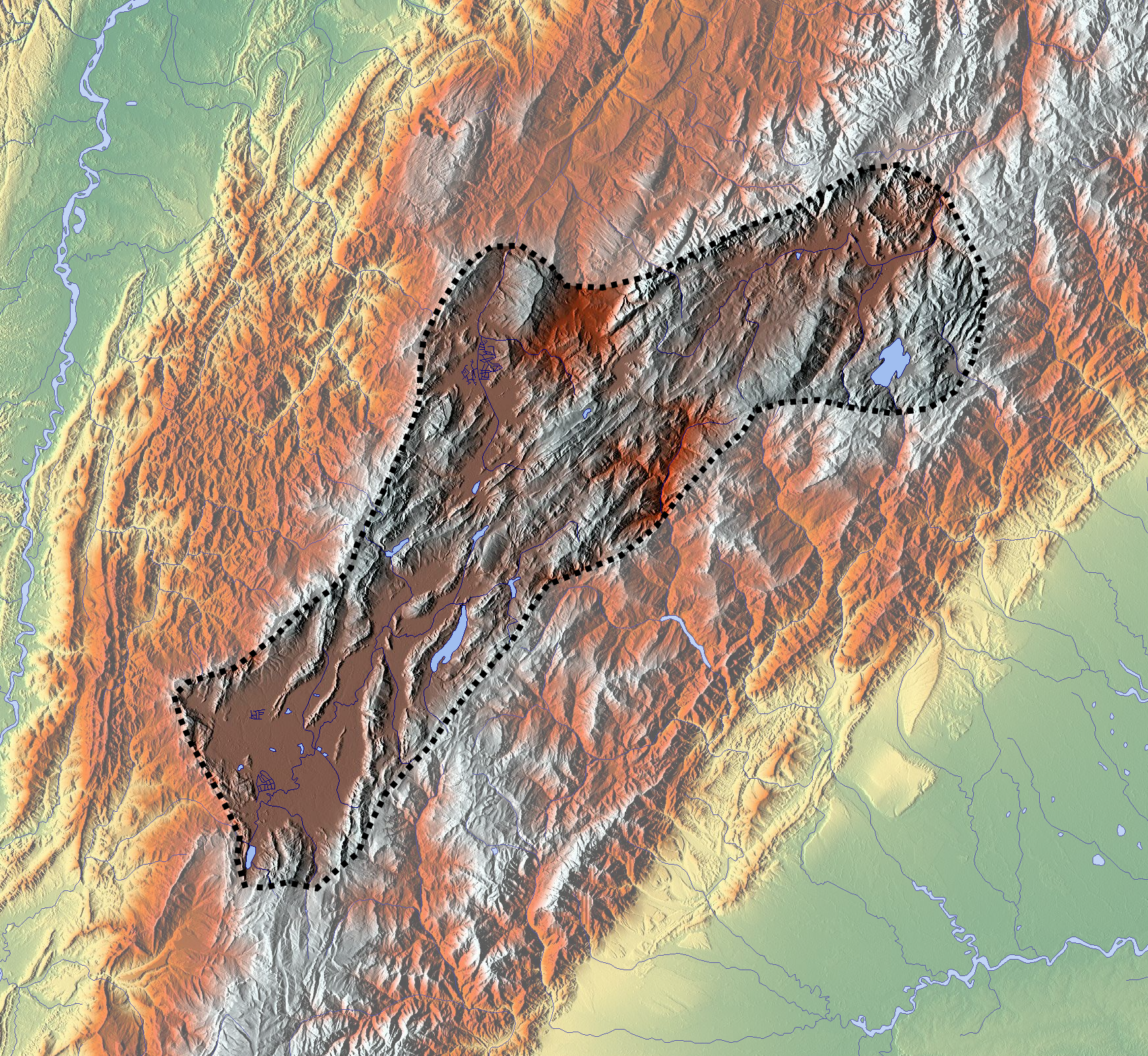
Type locality of the Soatá Formation to the northeast of the Altiplano Cundiboyacense. The Chicamocha River valley is clearly visible.

The Soatá Formation is apart from its type locality Portugalete found around Soatá (Jútua), and stretches to the north near the border of Boyacá and Santander, northeast of Tipacoque. To the south, the formation may have reached until Socotá.

== Regional correlations ==
Stratigraphy of the Llanos Basin and surrounding provinces
| Ma | Age | Paleomap | Regional events | Catatumbo | Cordillera | proximal Llanos | distal Llanos | Putumayo | VSM | Environments | Maximum thickness | Petroleum geology | Notes |
|---|---|---|---|---|---|---|---|---|---|---|---|---|---|
| 0.01 | Holocene | | Holocene volcanism Seismic activity | alluvium | | | | | | | | Overburden | |
| 1 | Pleistocene | | Pleistocene volcanism Andean orogeny 3 Glaciations | Guayabo | Soatá; Sabana | Necesidad | Guayabo | Gigante Neiva | | Alluvial to fluvial (Guayabo) | 550 m (1,800 ft) (Guayabo) | Overburden | |
| 2.6 | Pliocene | | Pliocene volcanism Andean orogeny 3 GABI | Guayabo | Subachoque | Necesidad | Guayabo | Gigante Neiva | | Alluvial to fluvial (Guayabo) | 550 m (1,800 ft) (Guayabo) | Overburden | |
| 5.3 | Messinian | | Andean orogeny 3 Foreland | Guayabo | Marichuela | Necesidad | Guayabo | Caimán | Honda | Alluvial to fluvial (Guayabo) | 550 m (1,800 ft) (Guayabo) | Overburden | |
| 13.5 | Langhian | | Regional flooding | León | hiatus | Caja | León | Caimán | Honda | Lacustrine (León) | 400 m (1,300 ft) (León) | Seal | |
| 16.2 | Burdigalian | | Miocene inundations Andean orogeny 2 | C1 | hiatus | Carbonera C1 | | Ospina | Honda | Proximal fluvio-deltaic (C1) | 850 m (2,790 ft) (Carbonera) | Reservoir | |
| 17.3 | Burdigalian | | Miocene inundations Andean orogeny 2 | C2 | hiatus | Carbonera C2 | | Ospina | Honda | Distal lacustrine-deltaic (C2) | 850 m (2,790 ft) (Carbonera) | Seal | |
| 19 | Burdigalian | | Miocene inundations Andean orogeny 2 | C3 | hiatus | Carbonera C3 | | Ospina | Honda | Proximal fluvio-deltaic (C3) | 850 m (2,790 ft) (Carbonera) | Reservoir | |
| 21 | Early Miocene | | Pebas wetlands | C4 | hiatus | Carbonera C4 | | Ospina | Barzalosa | Distal fluvio-deltaic (C4) | 850 m (2,790 ft) (Carbonera) | Seal | |
| 23 | Late Oligocene | | Andean orogeny 1 Foredeep | C5 | hiatus | Carbonera C5 | | Orito | | Proximal fluvio-deltaic (C5) | 850 m (2,790 ft) (Carbonera) | Reservoir | |
| 25 | Late Oligocene | | Andean orogeny 1 Foredeep | C6 | hiatus | Carbonera C6 | | Orito | | Distal fluvio-lacustrine (C6) | 850 m (2,790 ft) (Carbonera) | Seal | |
| 28 | Early Oligocene | | Andean orogeny 1 Foredeep | C7 | hiatus | C7 | | Pepino | Gualanday | Proximal deltaic-marine (C7) | 850 m (2,790 ft) (Carbonera) | Reservoir | |
| 32 | Oligo-Eocene | | Andean orogeny 1 Foredeep | C8 | Usme | C8 | onlap | Pepino | Gualanday | Marine-deltaic (C8) | 850 m (2,790 ft) (Carbonera) | Seal; Source | |
| 35 | Late Eocene | | Andean orogeny 1 Foredeep | Mirador | Usme | Mirador | | Pepino | Gualanday | Coastal (Mirador) | 240 m (790 ft) (Mirador) | Reservoir | |
| 40 | Middle Eocene | | Andean orogeny 1 Foredeep | Mirador | Regadera | Mirador | | Pepino | hiatus | Coastal (Mirador) | 240 m (790 ft) (Mirador) | Reservoir | |
| 45 | Middle Eocene | | Andean orogeny 1 Foredeep | Mirador | Regadera | Mirador | | Pepino | hiatus | Coastal (Mirador) | 240 m (790 ft) (Mirador) | Reservoir | |
| 50 | Early Eocene | | Andean orogeny 1 Foredeep | Socha | Regadera | Los Cuervos | | Pepino | hiatus | Deltaic (Los Cuervos) | 260 m (850 ft) (Los Cuervos) | Seal; Source | |
| 55 | Late Paleocene | | PETM; 2000 ppm CO_{2} | Los Cuervos | Bogotá | Los Cuervos | | Pepino | Gualanday | Deltaic (Los Cuervos) | 260 m (850 ft) (Los Cuervos) | Seal; Source | |
| 60 | Early Paleocene | | SALMA | Barco | Guaduas | Barco | | Rumiyaco | Gualanday | Fluvial (Barco) | 225 m (738 ft) (Barco) | Reservoir | |
| 65 | Maastrichtian | | KT extinction | Catatumbo | Guadalupe | | | Rumiyaco | Monserrate | Deltaic-fluvial (Guadalupe) | 750 m (2,460 ft) (Guadalupe) | Reservoir | |
| 72 | Campanian | | End of rifting | Colón-Mito Juan | Guadalupe | | | Rumiyaco | Monserrate | Deltaic-fluvial (Guadalupe) | 750 m (2,460 ft) (Guadalupe) | Reservoir | |
| 83 | Santonian | | End of rifting | Colón-Mito Juan | Guadalupe | | | Villeta/Güagüaquí | | Deltaic-fluvial (Guadalupe) | 750 m (2,460 ft) (Guadalupe) | Reservoir | |
| 86 | Coniacian | | End of rifting | Colón-Mito Juan | Guadalupe | | | Villeta/Güagüaquí | | Deltaic-fluvial (Guadalupe) | 750 m (2,460 ft) (Guadalupe) | Reservoir | |
| 89 | Turonian | | Cenomanian-Turonian anoxic event | La Luna | Chipaque | Gachetá | hiatus | Villeta/Güagüaquí | | Restricted marine (all) | 500 m (1,600 ft) (Gachetá) | Source | |
| 93 | Cenomanian | | Rift 2 | La Luna | Chipaque | Gachetá | hiatus | Villeta/Güagüaquí | | Restricted marine (all) | 500 m (1,600 ft) (Gachetá) | Source | |
| 100 | Albian | | Rift 2 | La Luna | Une | Une | hiatus | Caballos | | Deltaic (Une) | 500 m (1,600 ft) (Une) | Reservoir | |
| 113 | Aptian | | Rift 2 | Capacho | Fómeque | Une | hiatus | Motema | Yaví | Open marine (Fómeque) | 800 m (2,600 ft) (Fómeque) | Source (Fóm) | |
| 125 | Barremian | | High biodiversity | Aguardiente | Paja | Une | hiatus | Motema | Yaví | Shallow to open marine (Paja) | 940 m (3,080 ft) (Paja) | Reservoir | |
| 129 | Hauterivian | | Rift 1 | Tibú- Mercedes | Las Juntas | hiatus | hiatus | Motema | Yaví | Deltaic (Las Juntas) | 910 m (2,990 ft) (Las Juntas) | Reservoir (LJun) | |
| 133 | Valanginian | | Rift 1 | Río Negro | Cáqueza; Macanal; Rosablanca | hiatus | hiatus | Motema | Yaví | Restricted marine (Macanal) | 2,935 m (9,629 ft) (Macanal) | Source (Mac) | |
| 140 | Berriasian | | Rift 1 | Girón | Cáqueza; Macanal; Rosablanca | hiatus | hiatus | Motema | Yaví | Restricted marine (Macanal) | 2,935 m (9,629 ft) (Macanal) | Source (Mac) | |
| 145 | Tithonian | | Break-up of Pangea | Jordán | Arcabuco | Buenavista Batá | hiatus | Saldaña | | Alluvial, fluvial (Buenavista) | 110 m (360 ft) (Buenavista) | "Jurassic" | |
| 150 | Early-Mid Jurassic | | Passive margin 2 | La Quinta | Montebel Noreán | hiatus | hiatus | Saldaña | | Coastal tuff (La Quinta) | 100 m (330 ft) (La Quinta) | "Jurassic" | |
| 201 | Late Triassic | | Passive margin 2 | Mucuchachi | Montebel Noreán | hiatus | hiatus | Payandé | | | | "Jurassic" | |
| 235 | Early Triassic | | Pangea | | hiatus | hiatus | hiatus | | | | | "Paleozoic" | |
| 250 | Permian | | Pangea | | hiatus | hiatus | hiatus | | | | | "Paleozoic" | |
| 300 | Late Carboniferous | | Famatinian orogeny | | hiatus | hiatus | hiatus | | Cerro Neiva () | | | "Paleozoic" | |
| 340 | Early Carboniferous | | Fossil fish Romer's gap | | Cuche (355-385) | Farallones () | | | Cerro Neiva () | Deltaic, estuarine (Cuche) | 900 m (3,000 ft) (Cuche) | "Paleozoic" | |
| 360 | Late Devonian | | Passive margin 1 | Río Cachirí (360-419) | Cuche (355-385) | Farallones () | | | Ambicá () | Alluvial-fluvial-reef (Farallones) | 2,400 m (7,900 ft) (Farallones) | "Paleozoic" | |
| 390 | Early Devonian | | High biodiversity | Floresta (387-400) El Tíbet | | | | | Ambicá () | Shallow marine (Floresta) | 600 m (2,000 ft) (Floresta) | "Paleozoic" | |
| 410 | Late Silurian | | Silurian mystery | Floresta (387-400) El Tíbet | | | | | | | | "Paleozoic" | |
| 425 | Early Silurian | | Silurian mystery | hiatus | | | | | | | | "Paleozoic" | |
| 440 | Late Ordovician | | Rich fauna in Bolivia | San Pedro (450-490) | | Duda () | | | | | | "Paleozoic" | |
| 470 | Early Ordovician | | First fossils | San Pedro (450-490) | Busbanzá (>470±22) Chuscales Otengá | Guape () | | Río Nevado () | Hígado () Agua Blanca; Venado (470-475) | | | "Paleozoic" | |
| 488 | Late Cambrian | | Regional intrusions | Chicamocha (490-515) | Quetame () | Ariarí () | | SJ del Guaviare (490-590) | San Isidro () | | | "Paleozoic" | |
| 515 | Early Cambrian | | Cambrian explosion | | Quetame () | | | SJ del Guaviare (490-590) | San Isidro () | | | "Paleozoic" | |
| 542 | Ediacaran | | Break-up of Rodinia | | pre-Quetame | | post-Parguaza | SJ del Guaviare (490-590) | El Barro () | Yellow: allochthonous basement (Chibcha terrane); Green: autochthonous basement (Río Negro-Juruena Province) | | Basement | |
| 600 | Neoproterozoic | | Cariri Velhos orogeny | Bucaramanga (600-1400) | pre-Quetame | | post-Parguaza | pre-Guaviare | El Barro () | Yellow: allochthonous basement (Chibcha terrane); Green: autochthonous basement (Río Negro-Juruena Province) | | Basement | |
| 800 | Neoproterozoic | | Snowball Earth | Bucaramanga (600-1400) | pre-Quetame | | post-Parguaza | pre-Guaviare | El Barro () | Yellow: allochthonous basement (Chibcha terrane); Green: autochthonous basement (Río Negro-Juruena Province) | | Basement | |
| 1000 | Mesoproterozoic | | Sunsás orogeny | Bucaramanga (600-1400) | pre-Quetame | Ariarí (1000) | post-Parguaza | pre-Guaviare | La Urraca (1030-1100) | Yellow: allochthonous basement (Chibcha terrane); Green: autochthonous basement (Río Negro-Juruena Province) | | Basement | |
| 1300 | Mesoproterozoic | | Rondônia-Juruá orogeny | Bucaramanga (600-1400) | pre-Quetame | pre-Ariarí | Parguaza (1300-1400) | pre-Guaviare | Garzón (1180-1550) | Yellow: allochthonous basement (Chibcha terrane); Green: autochthonous basement (Río Negro-Juruena Province) | | Basement | |
| 1400 | Mesoproterozoic | | Rondônia-Juruá orogeny | pre-Bucaramanga | pre-Quetame | pre-Ariarí | | pre-Guaviare | Garzón (1180-1550) | Yellow: allochthonous basement (Chibcha terrane); Green: autochthonous basement (Río Negro-Juruena Province) | | Basement | |
| 1600 | Paleoproterozoic | | Rondônia-Juruá orogeny | pre-Bucaramanga | pre-Quetame | pre-Ariarí | Maimachi (1500-1700) | pre-Guaviare | pre-Garzón | Yellow: allochthonous basement (Chibcha terrane); Green: autochthonous basement (Río Negro-Juruena Province) | | Basement | |
| 1800 | Paleoproterozoic | | Tapajós orogeny | pre-Bucaramanga | pre-Quetame | pre-Ariarí | Mitú (1800) | pre-Guaviare | pre-Garzón | Yellow: allochthonous basement (Chibcha terrane); Green: autochthonous basement (Río Negro-Juruena Province) | | Basement | |
| 1950 | Paleoproterozoic | | Transamazonic orogeny | pre-Bucaramanga | pre-Quetame | pre-Ariarí | pre-Mitú | pre-Guaviare | pre-Garzón | Yellow: allochthonous basement (Chibcha terrane); Green: autochthonous basement (Río Negro-Juruena Province) | | Basement | |
| 2200 | Paleoproterozoic | | Columbia | pre-Bucaramanga | pre-Quetame | pre-Ariarí | pre-Mitú | pre-Guaviare | pre-Garzón | Yellow: allochthonous basement (Chibcha terrane); Green: autochthonous basement (Río Negro-Juruena Province) | | Basement | |
| 2530 | Archean | | Carajas-Imataca orogeny | pre-Bucaramanga | pre-Quetame | pre-Ariarí | pre-Mitú | pre-Guaviare | pre-Garzón | Yellow: allochthonous basement (Chibcha terrane); Green: autochthonous basement (Río Negro-Juruena Province) | | Basement | |
| 3100 | Archean | | Kenorland | pre-Bucaramanga | pre-Quetame | pre-Ariarí | pre-Mitú | pre-Guaviare | pre-Garzón | Yellow: allochthonous basement (Chibcha terrane); Green: autochthonous basement (Río Negro-Juruena Province) | | Basement | |

Legend

- group
- important formation
- fossiliferous formation
- minor formation
- (age in Ma)
- proximal Llanos (Medina) (Note: based on Duarte et al. (2019), García González et al. (2009), and geological report of Villavicencio)
- distal Llanos (Saltarin 1A well) (Note: based on Duarte et al. (2019) and the hydrocarbon potential evaluation performed by the UIS and ANH in 2009)

== See also ==
- Geology of the Eastern Hills
- Geology of the Ocetá Páramo
- Geology of the Altiplano Cundiboyacense
