= Jordán, Santander =

Coordinates: 6°45′N 73°04′W

Jordan, Santander
- Municipality and town
- Location of the municipality and town of Jordan, Santander in the Santander Department of Colombia.
- Country: Colombia
- Department: Santander Department
- Time zone: UTC-5 (Colombia Standard Time)

Jordán (Spanish pronunciation: [xoɾˈðan]) is a town and municipality in the Santander Department in northeastern Colombia.

The little town of Jordán, located in the Colombian Department of Santander. has a population of around 56/67 people. Not to mention that this little town is located in the middle of the Cañón del Chicamocha, The second largest Canyon in the world. The town is mainly based in agriculture, since it has large fields of fruits like; lemons, Tomatoes and Oranges.
