= National Route 1 (Colombia) =

Highway in Colombia

National Route 01

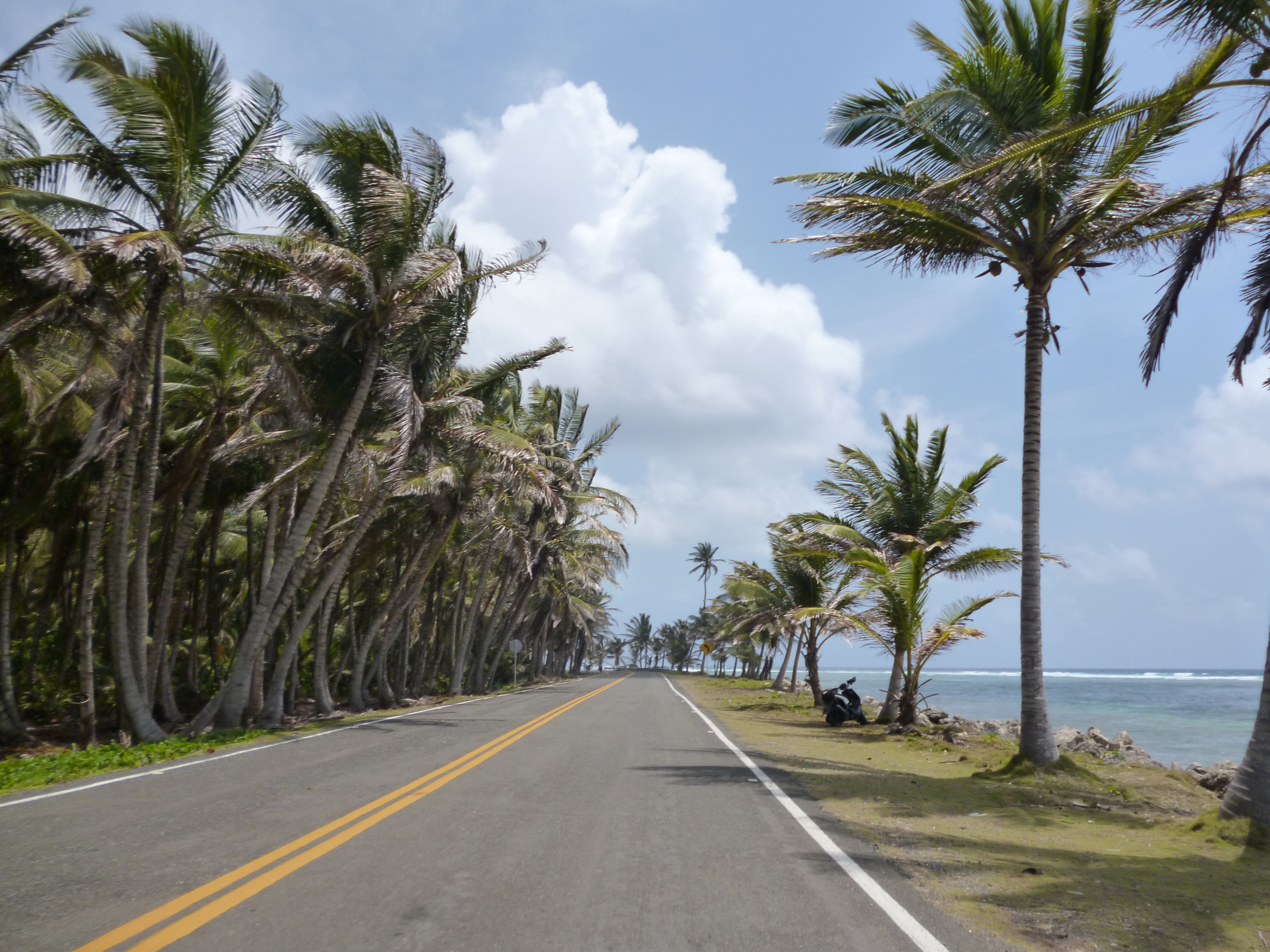

Route information
- Length: 28 km (17 mi)

Location
- Country: Colombia

Highway system
- Highways in Colombia

National Route 1 is a trunk highway that is mostly known as the Circunvalar de San Andrés or Circunvalación de la Isla de San Andrés. This route runs along the perimeter of the island of San Andrés in the department of San Andrés and Providencia.
