= National Route 3 (Colombia) =

Highway in Colombia

National Route 03

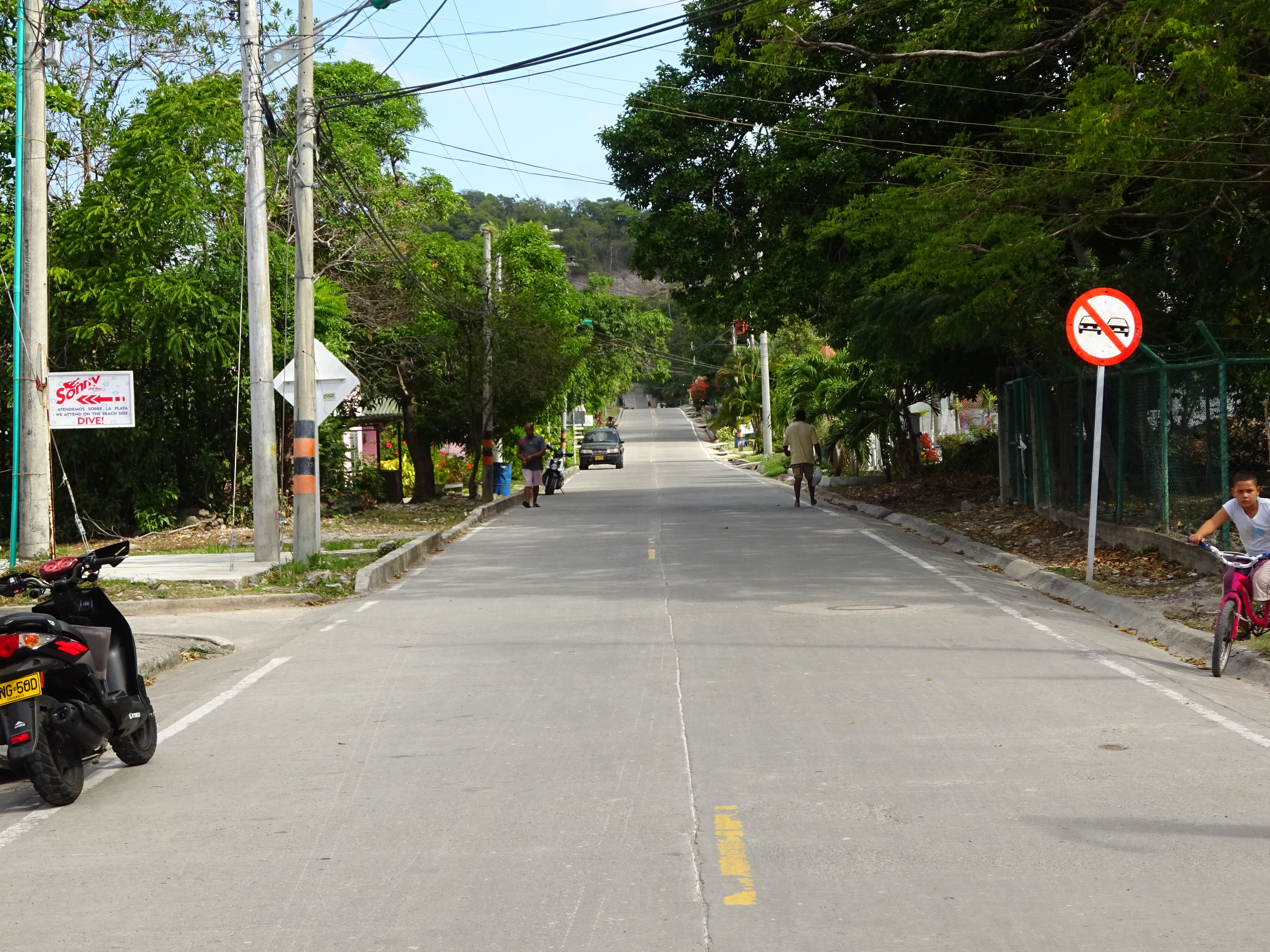

Route information
- Length: 17.50 km (10.87 mi)

Location
- Country: Colombia

Highway system
- Highways in Colombia

National Route 3 is a trunk highway that is mostly known as the Circunvalar de Providencia or Circunvalación de la Isla de Providencia. This route runs along the perimeter of Providencia Island in the department of San Andrés and Providencia.
