= Highways in Colombia =

Map of the Colombia highway network.

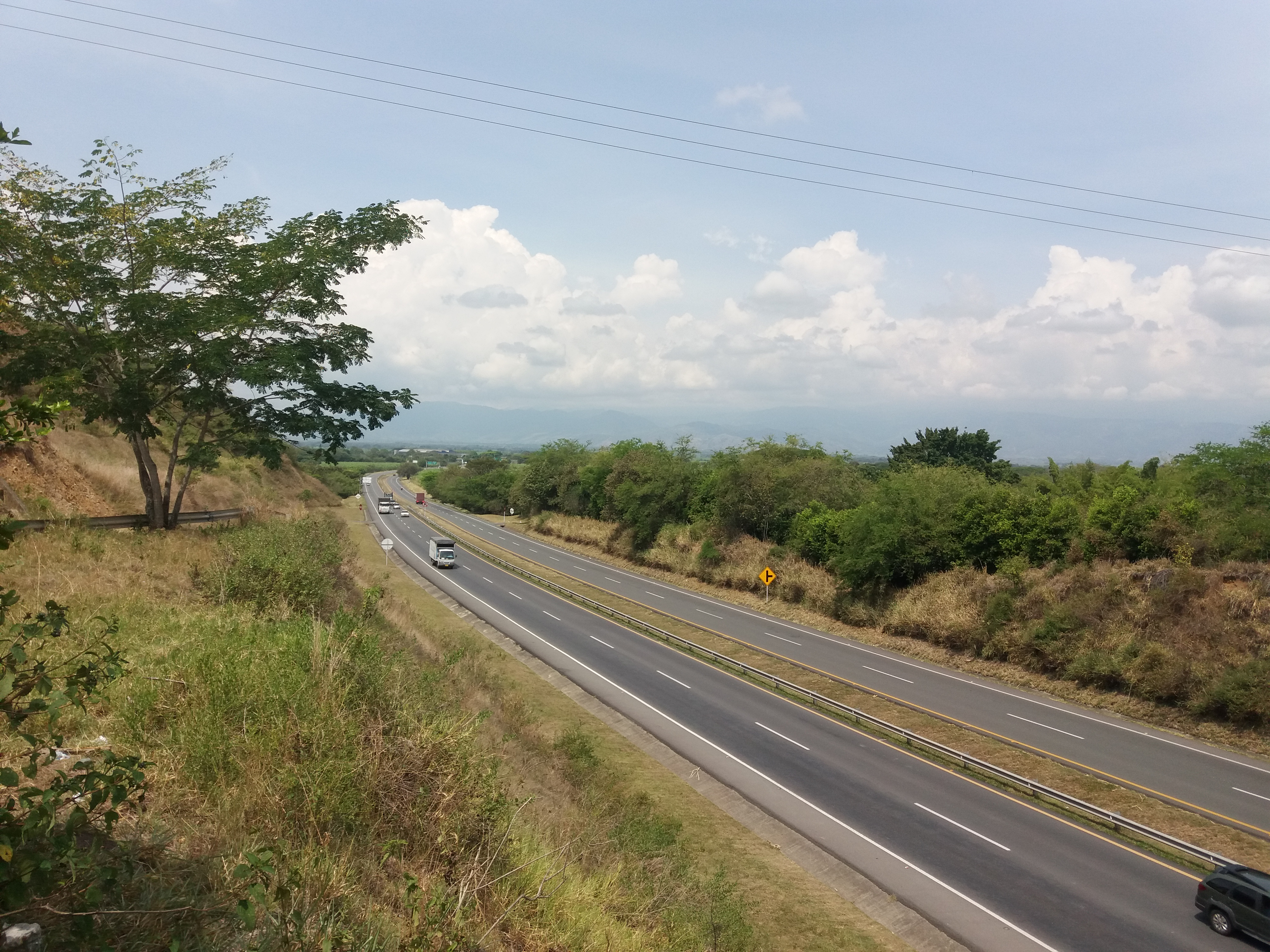
Freeway of Route 25 between Tuluá and Andalucía, Valle del Cauca. In 2014 there were 2,279 kilometers of dual carriageway highways in Colombia.

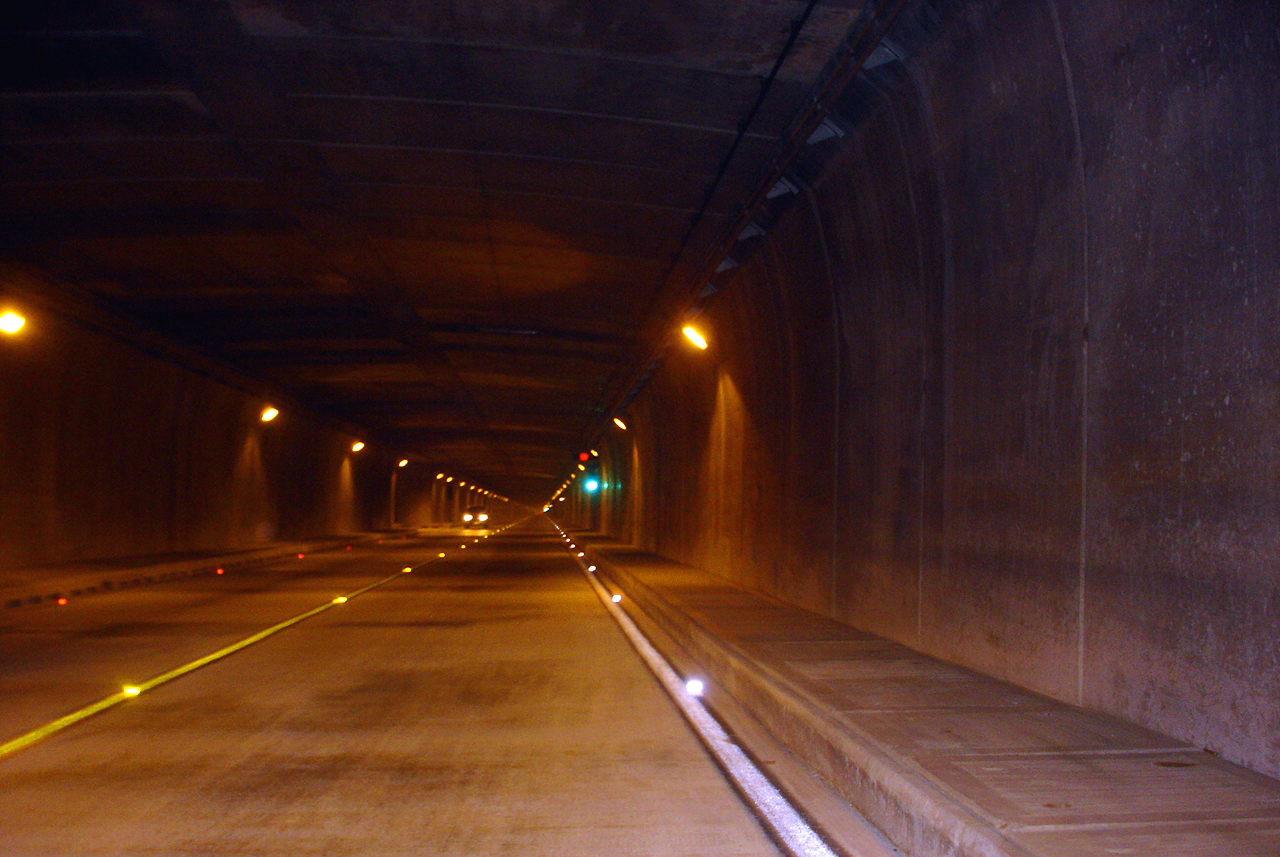
Occidente tunnel, Antioquia.

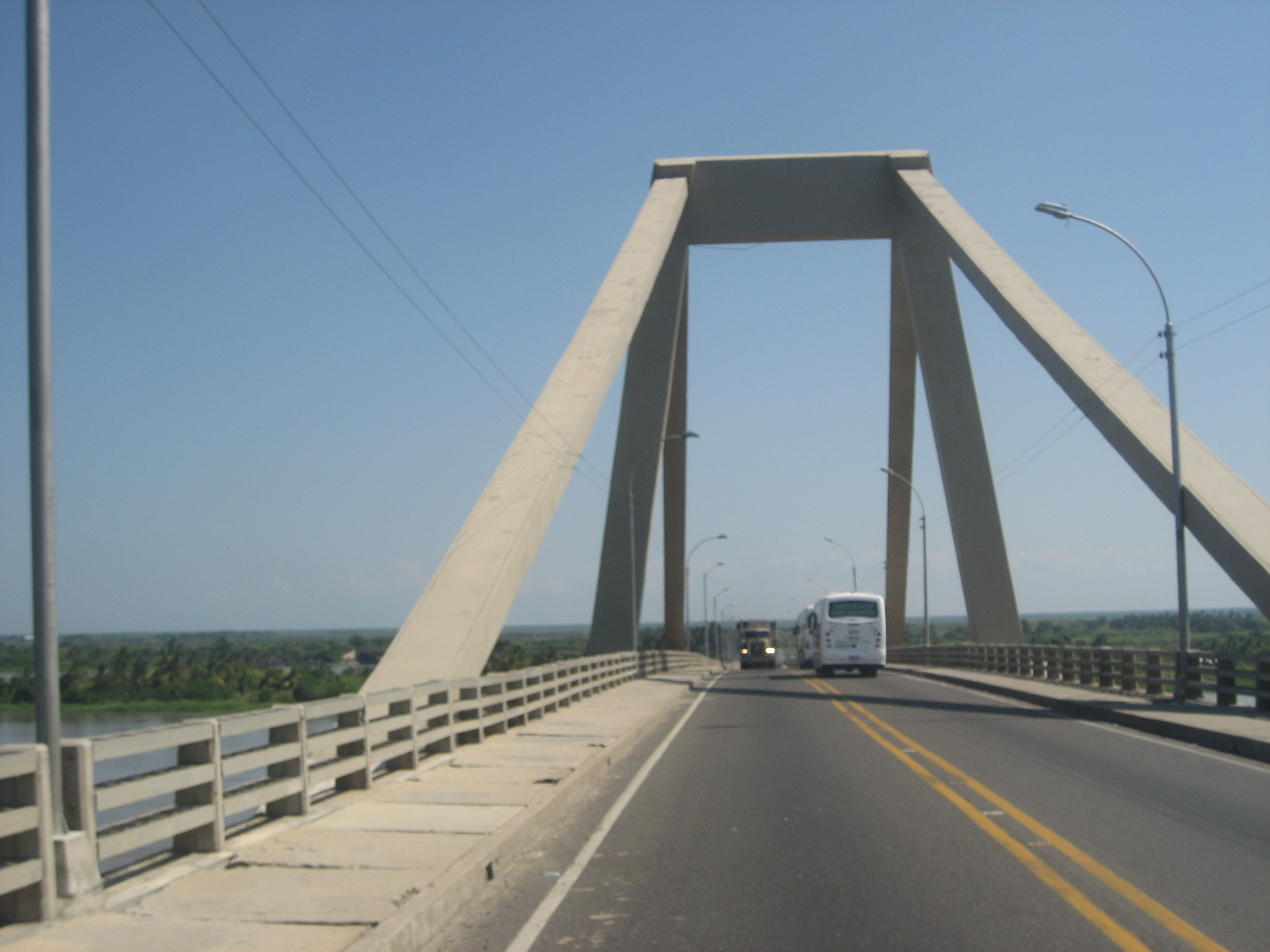
Pumarejo bridge over the Magdalena River, Barranquilla.

Colombian geography presents formidable challenges to roadbuilders, who need to integrate its largest production centers deep within the Andes with major ports in both the Atlantic and Pacific oceans. All of this creates a heavy premium to roadbuilding, compared with the cost of building highways in flat terrain. Therefore, the Colombian government is undertaking a great effort in order to improve the highway system, under the name of Fourth Generation Highways, with the intent of updating major roads to international safety and speed standards. This project will be funded through both public and private capital, with a total worth of nearly US$23 billion, accounting to a yearly investment of 3% of national GDP, improving or building a grand total of over 8,000 km of roads. These roads are expected to improve Colombia's competitiveness in order to successfully take advantage of the many trade agreements signed in recent years.

Highway safety in Colombia is enforced by the Highway Police, a unit of the National Police of Colombia. Colombia is crossed by the Pan-American Highway.

== Primary routes ==
The main highways (with primary route numbers) include:

=== Western Trunk - National Route 25 ===
Colombia is crossed by the Western Trunk highway (part of the Pan-American Highway) that connects to the south with Ecuador (where the highway is called the Sierra Trunk or Troncal de Sierra) and other South American countries. This international route connects to the national highway network on the Rumichaca Bridge in Nariño Department, which marks the international border between Colombia and Ecuador. From there and to the north, this road connects the cities of Pasto, Popayán, Cali, the Colombian Coffee-Growers Axis (Eje Cafetero or "Coffee Region"), Anserma, Medellín, Sincelejo and Barranquilla, where it connects to the Caribbean Transverse highway. Difficulties arise in the Darién Gap between Panama and Colombia as there are no connections by land in Colombia with Central America and the rest of North America.

=== Magdalena Trunk - National Route 45 ===
The Magdalena Trunk crosses the section between the town of San Miguel, Putumayo at the border with Ecuador and the point known as Y de Ciénaga, a few kilometers from the city of Santa Marta on the Caribbean Sea. The road runs parallel to the Magdalena River, mainly on its right bank. This pathway allows the integration of central Colombia with the system of ports located on its Caribbean coast as well as the ports of Cartagena, Barranquilla and Santa Marta.

=== Caribbean Transverse - National Route 90 ===
The Caribbean Transverse highway runs parallel to the Caribbean Sea coastline and joins the cities of Turbo (Antioquia) and Paraguachón (La Guajira), where it connects to the highway network in Venezuela. The highway connects the capital cities of this region: Montería, Sincelejo, Cartagena, Barranquilla, Santa Marta and Riohacha. This route is also called Caribbean Trunk and connects to the Magdalena Trunk (National Route 45) in a place known as Y de Ciénaga, just 6 km from the town of Ciénaga (Magdalena) and the Western Trunk at two different points: in the municipality of Toluviejo (18 km from Sincelejo) and the city of Barranquilla.

=== Buenaventura Transverse - Puerto Carreño - National Route 40 ===
The Buenaventura Transverse highway connects the country's largest port with the Venezuelan border in Puerto Carreño. Highway sections 06 (Bogotá - Villavicencio) and 07 (Villavicencio - Puerto López) are part of the Autopista al Llano ("Llano Tollway") section of the Buenaventura Transverse highway.

=== Central Trunk - National Route 45A ===
The Central Trunk highway connects the city of Bogotá with the departments of Boyacá and Santander. Major cities on this route include Zipaquirá, Chiquinquirá and Bucaramanga. The highway ends in the municipality of San Alberto, where it connects with the Magdalena Trunk highway (National Route 45).

=== North-Central Trunk - National Route 55 ===
The North-Central Trunk highway begins in the village of La Caro in the town of Chía, connecting to Bogotá and Cundinamarca Department to the municipalities of Gachancipá, Tocancipá and Villapinzón. In Boyacá Department, the route changes to a north-south direction and later reaches Tunja, the capital of Boyacá Department. The highway continues through the towns of Paipa, Duitama and Soatá in Boyacá Department and Málaga in Santander Department. The highway terminates in Puerto Santander near the border with Venezuela.

=== Carretera Marginal de la Selva - National Route 65 ===
Carretera Marginal de la Selva ("Jungle Border Highway") is an important South American route originally planned in 1963 to join the Amazon regions of Bolivia, Peru, Ecuador, Colombia and Venezuela. In Colombia, this route begins at the San Miguel International Bridge (on the border with Ecuador) and follows the first stretch of the Magdalena Trunk highway to the municipality of Villa, where National Route 65 turns north toward the right side of the Cordillera Oriental mountains. The highway is scheduled to be extended to Saravena on the border with Venezuela; however, the section between Mina Blanca and La Uribe is not built yet, so the highway is currently divided into two sections. The southern section is also known as the Forest Trunk section and the northern section is known as the Llano Trunk section.

=== Other routes ===
- National Route 1
- National Route 3
