= Chicamocha National Park cable car =

Aerial tramway in Santander, Colombia

Coordinates: 6.7887°N 73.0215°W

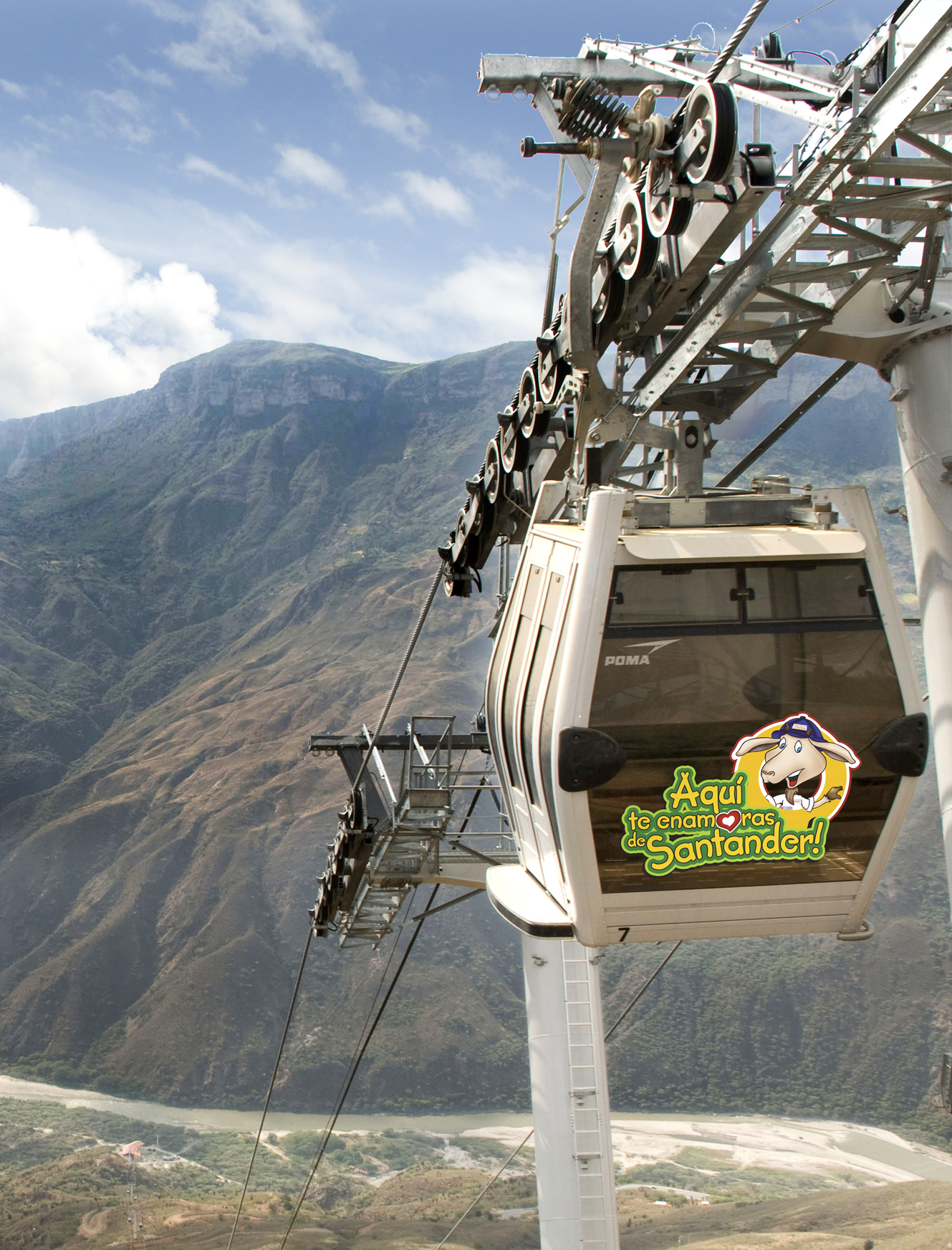
Photography by INGSAS.C.A

Chicamocha National Park Cable Car is longest single line gondola lift in Colombia and in the Americas, and one of the longest in the world. It is located within the Chicamocha National Park, Santander, Colombia. It differs from other cable cars around the world due to its engineering design, beautiful view, altitude and its outstanding layout.

== General Information ==
Constructing Company	Temporary union: Poma Galski, Ingsas and Termotécnic
System	Continuous, single cable, bidirectional, removable handles and close cabins
Length	6.3 km (3.9 mi)
Difference in altitude	500 meters above sea level to 1,684 meters above sea level
Cabins	38
Stations (3)	Mesa de los Santos, Rio Chicamocha, Chicamocha National Park
Passengers per cabin	8
Speed	5–6 meters per second
Capacity	500 passengers per hour
Completion date	January 2009
Prices	Adults: $68,000 Colombian Pesos Children and Seniors: $46,000 Colombian Pesos; These prices include the entrance fee.

== Overview ==
The Chicamocha National Park Cable Car was inaugurated in January 2009. It was constructed by the temporary union of Poma Galski, Ingsas and Termotecnic engineering firms. It is 6.3 kilometers long and it is powered by 3 stations. The ride can take from 22 minutes at maximum speed (high season) to 30 minutes at regular speed. The visitors of the Chicamocha National Park enjoy a spectacular panorama on the more than 6 kilometer ride with the cable car. In Colombia and in the whole world, the cable car has generated great expectation since it is the only one which crosses a 6.3 kilometer canyon.

== Functionality ==
The cable-car uses a transportation system with cabins which are in fixed position attached to a high performance iron cable. This cable is pulled by motors and rotating wheels at each station. This entire process is powered by three energy plants of 13,200 volts at each station. The 6.3 kilometers are divided in the following way: 2 kilometers between the stations Park-River and 4.3 between the stations River-Mesa de los Santos. The average speed of each cabin is around 6 meters per second. The cable car has a sophisticated system that allows a continuous monitoring of the status of the entire system from each station. This system uses sensors to know the weight of each cabin, humidity, temperature, wind's velocity and other important variables that may affect the functionality of the system.

== Engineering Challenge ==
The construction and design of Chicamocha National Park Cable Car was a great challenge for engineering. The inclined topography and climate conditions of the region were the root of this challenge. A modern Russian helicopter participated in the installation of great part of the twenty nine support columns, each one with an approximate height of 25 meters and two tonnes of weight. Even hundreds of mules were needed to transport the hundreds of tons of cement and aggregates. This colossal engineering marvel was a result of the combination of the knowledge and experience of Colombian engineering plus the design and technology of French engineering.
