= Chicamocha River =

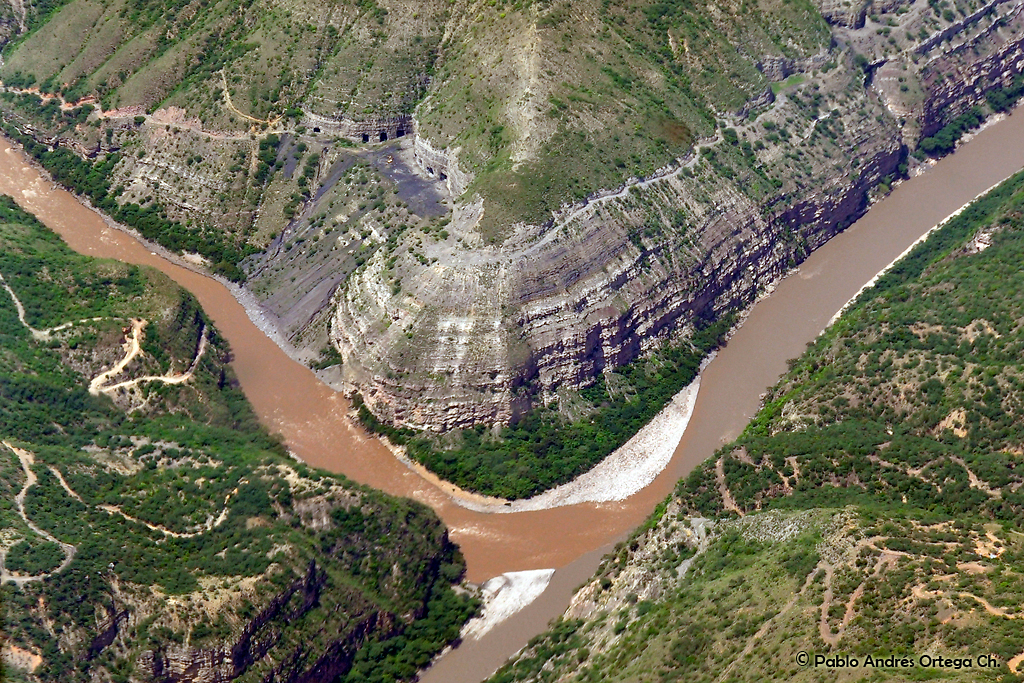
- Suaréz, Chicamocha and Sogamoso rivers in its canyon

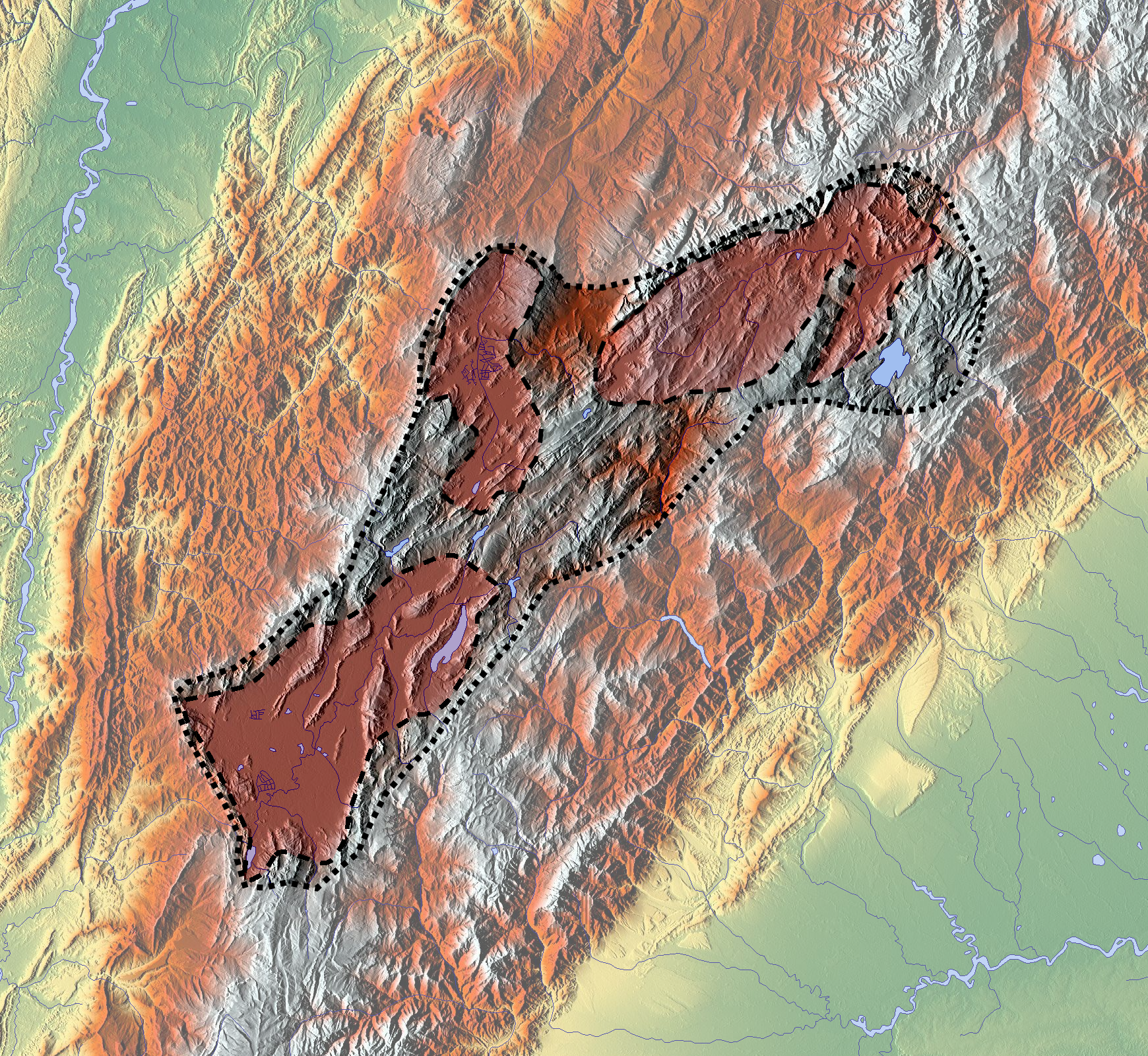
- Location of the Chicamocha River in Colombia Chicamocha River (the Altiplano Cundiboyacense)

Location
- Country: Colombia

Physical characteristics
- Source
  - location: Tuta, Boyacá
  - coordinates: 5°42′N 73°14′W
  - elevation: 2,600 m (8,500 ft)
- Mouth
  - location: Sogamoso River
  - elevation: 700 m (2,300 ft)
- Length: 400 km (250 mi)

Basin features
- Progression: Sogamoso-Magdalena-Caribbean
- River system: Magdalena
- Landmarks: Chicamocha Canyon

Chicamocha River is a river of Boyacá and Santander in central-eastern Colombia. It is part of the Magdalena river system that flows into the Caribbean Sea.

The Chicamocha River rises in the municipality of Tuta in the Department of Boyacá, flows through the Department of Santander and joins the Suárez River (with its tributary Fonce River) to form the Sogamoso River.

== Chicamocha National Park ==
The Chicamocha Canyon contains the Chicamocha National Park (PANACHI; Parque Nacional del Chicamocha), a major tourist destination in Colombia. It was preselected for the election of New 7 Wonders of Nature.

== Gallery ==
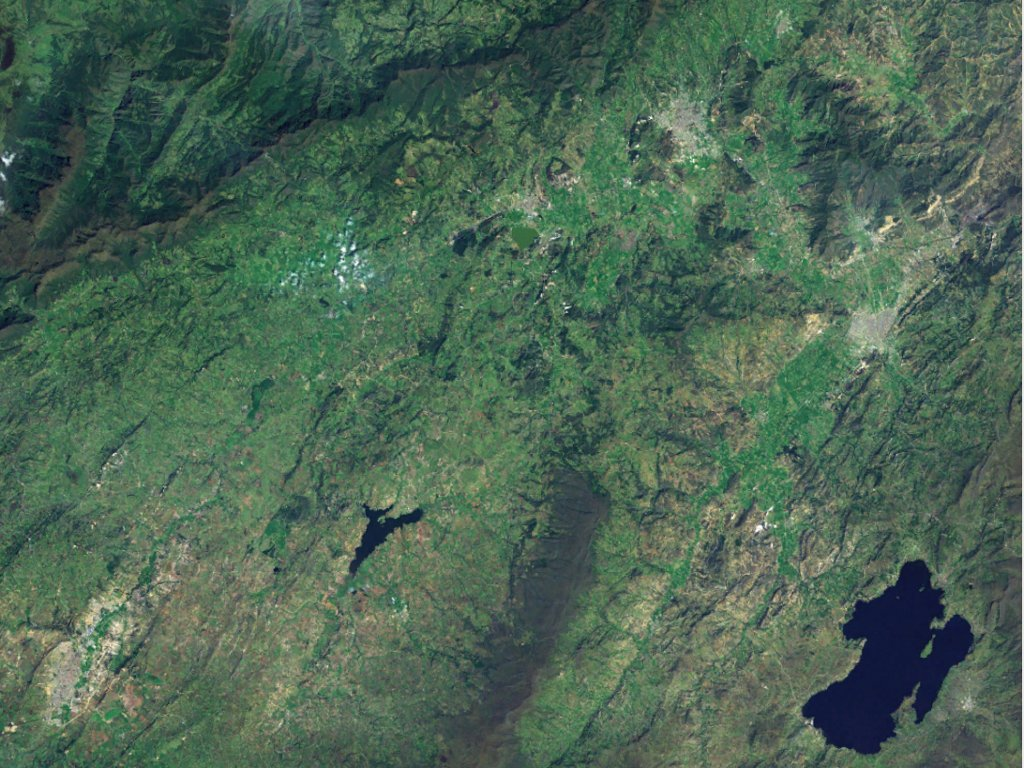
Alto Chicamocha; Paipa, Duitama, Sogamoso

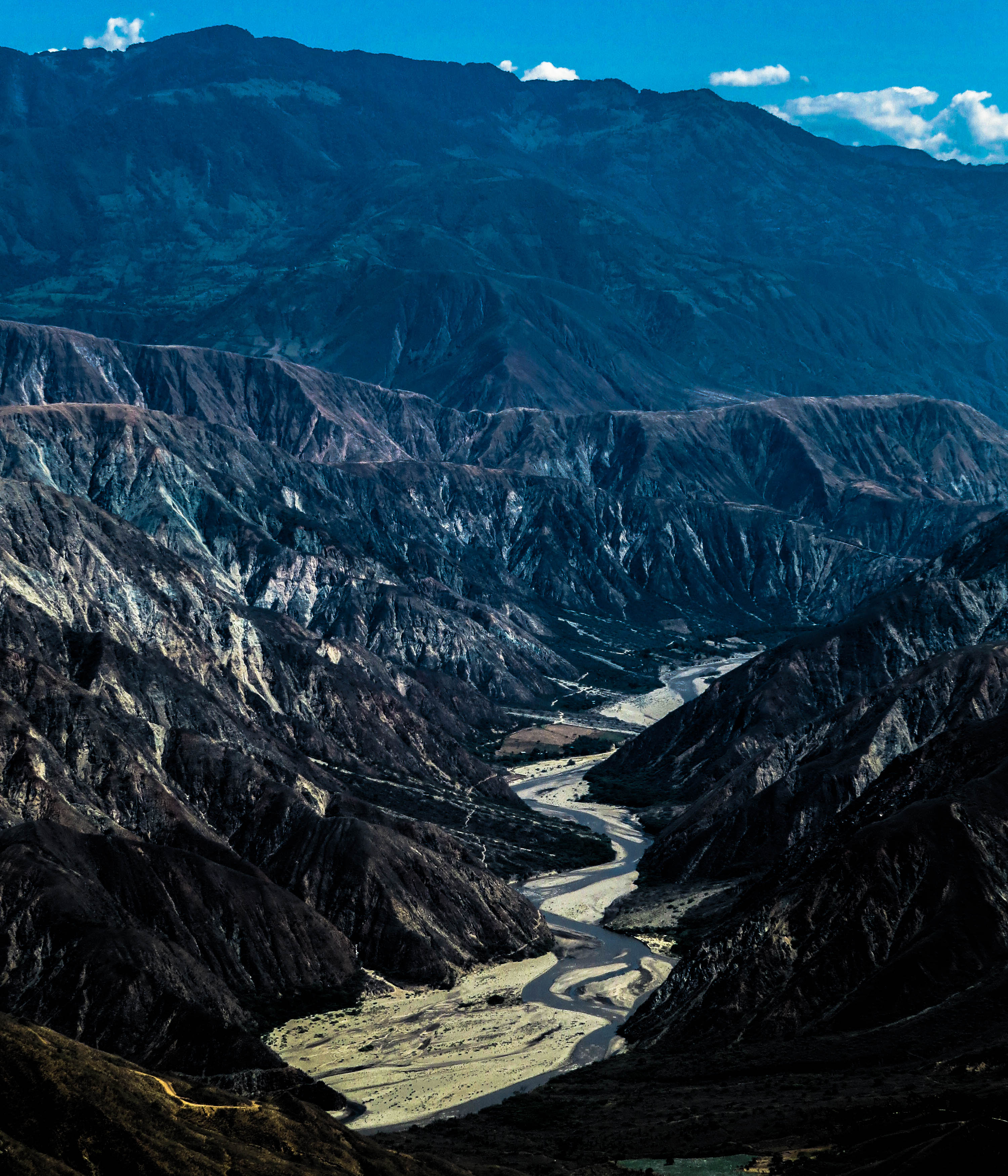
Course of the Chicamocha River through its canyon

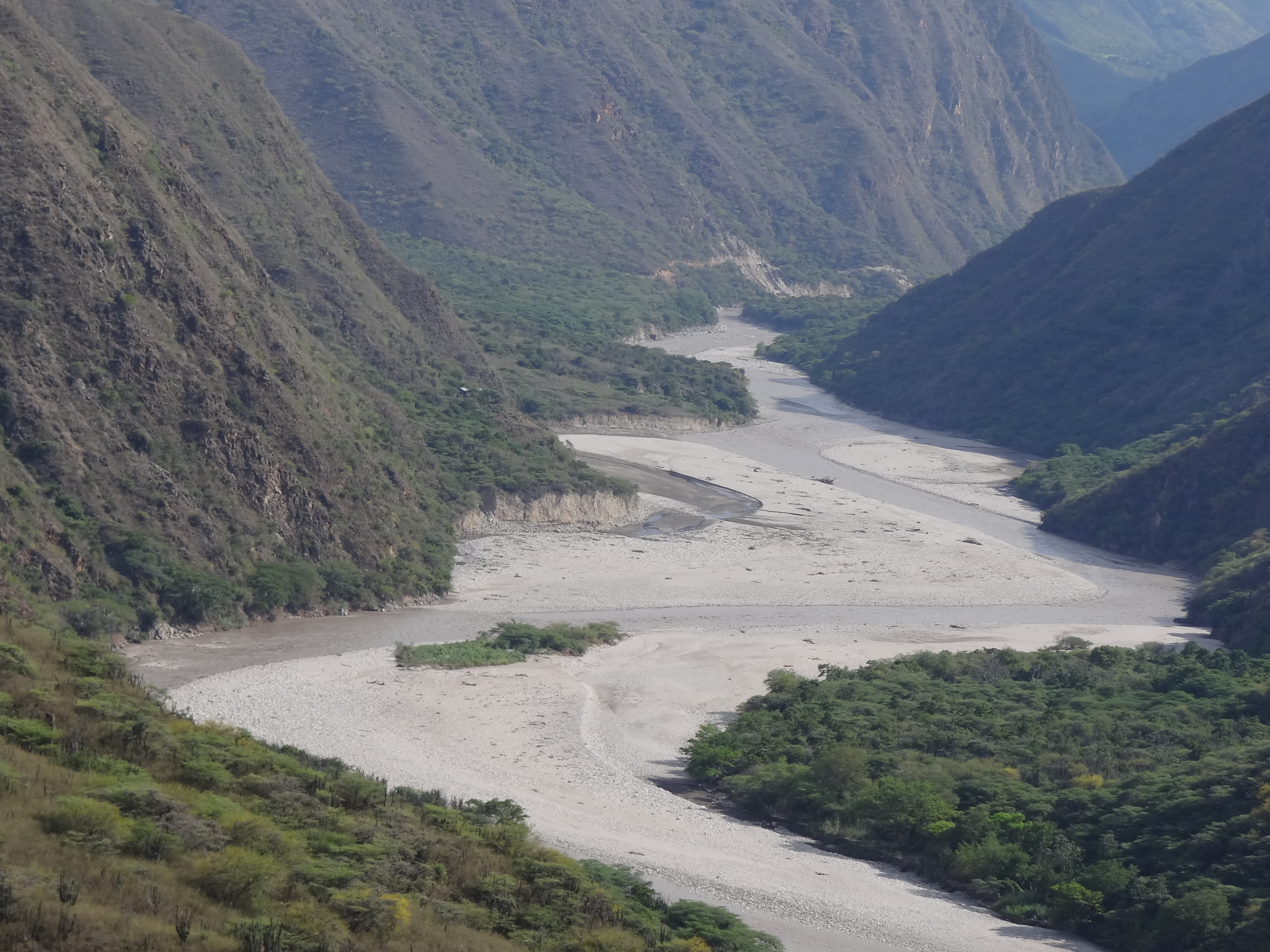
Chicamocha River, Panachi

== See also ==
- List of rivers of Colombia
- Chicamocha Canyon
- Guane people
