= Chicamocha National Park =

National park in Colombia

- IUCN category II (national park)
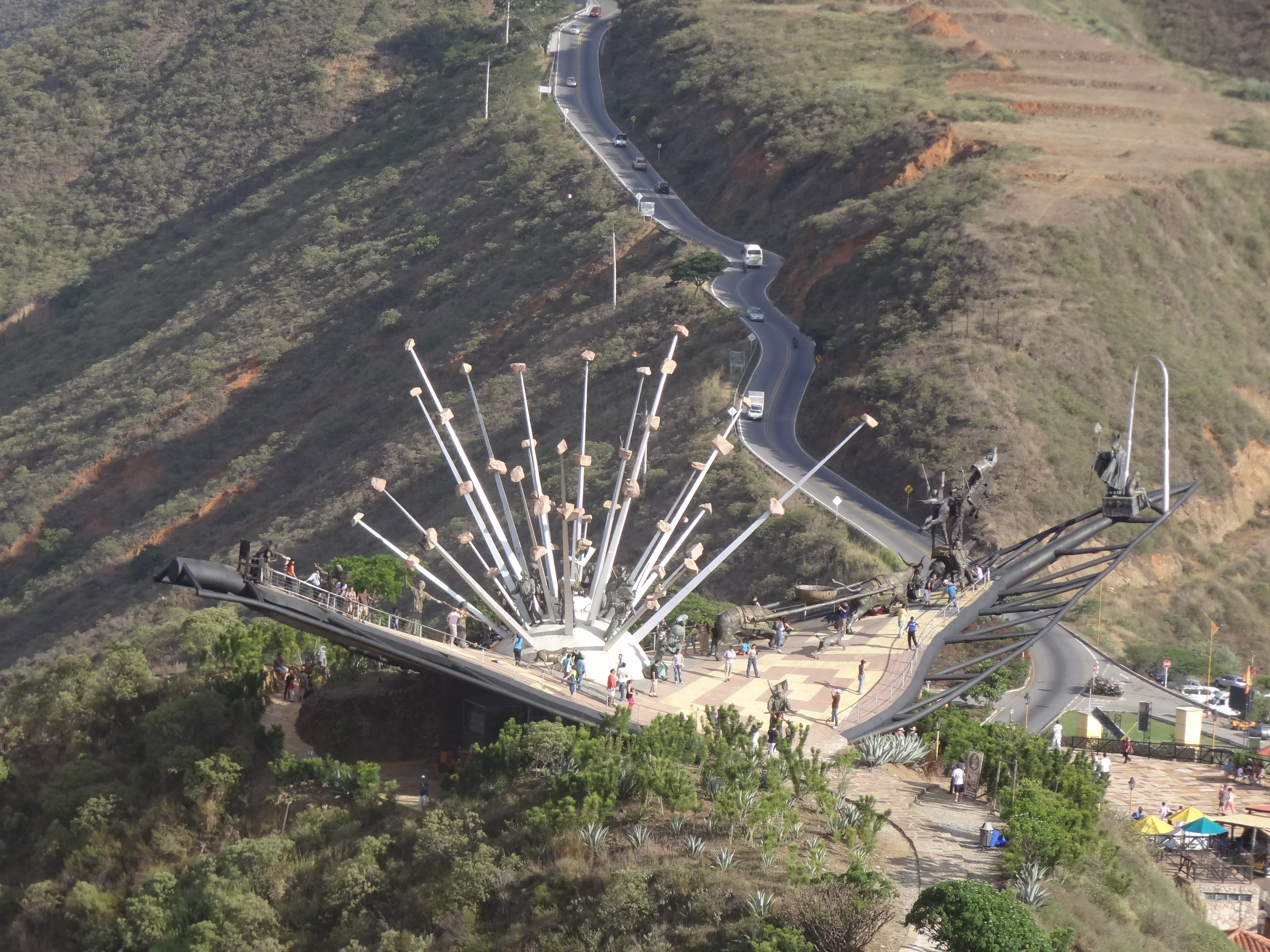
- Monument to the Santanderean culture
- Interactive map of Chicamocha National Park
- Location: Santander, Colombia
- Nearest city: Aratoca
- Coordinates: 6°47′23.28″N 73°00′14.35″W
- Established: January 1, 2006
- Governing body: Government of Colombia

Chicamocha National Park (Spanish:Parque Nacional del Chicamocha), also known as Panachi, is a Colombian national level natural park along the Chicamocha Canyon (Cañón del Chicamocha) located 50 km from the city of Bucaramanga, Santander. The site is a tourist attraction due to is spectacular landscape and the variety of outdoor activities that it offers such as paragliding, spelunking, bushwalking, camping, fishing, kayaking, rafting, mountain climbing, etc. The park is located on the highway between Bucaramanga and San Gil, 54 kilometers from Santander's largest and capital city Bucaramanga.

== Aerial tramway ==
The park features an aerial tramway that crosses Chicamocha Canyon, in addition, there are parking spaces, viewing decks, and plenty of trails. Cultural activities include the Museo Guane, Plaza de las Costumbres and the Salón de Exposiciones, skating rink, karts circuit, ostriches, goats, a monument named monument to Santanderean culture, a 360 degree viewing deck located at the highest point of the canyon

The tram allows tourists to see the canyon in all its splendor. The park is a common destination because besides its natural features the park is geared towards a more family experience by including an area with constructions typical of the Santander department, a field for practicing paragliding and the practicing of Kayaking and rafting is also allowed.

The park is served by a 6.3 km length cable car system. It is one of the longest systems of its type in the world. The system goes across the canyon from the station "Mesa de los Santos" to Panachi. It has three stations: The first one is located inside the park, the middle one next to the river and the last one in the "Vereda el Tabacal". Opened in January 2009, it quickly became popular for all its attractions, but the cable car became even more famous.

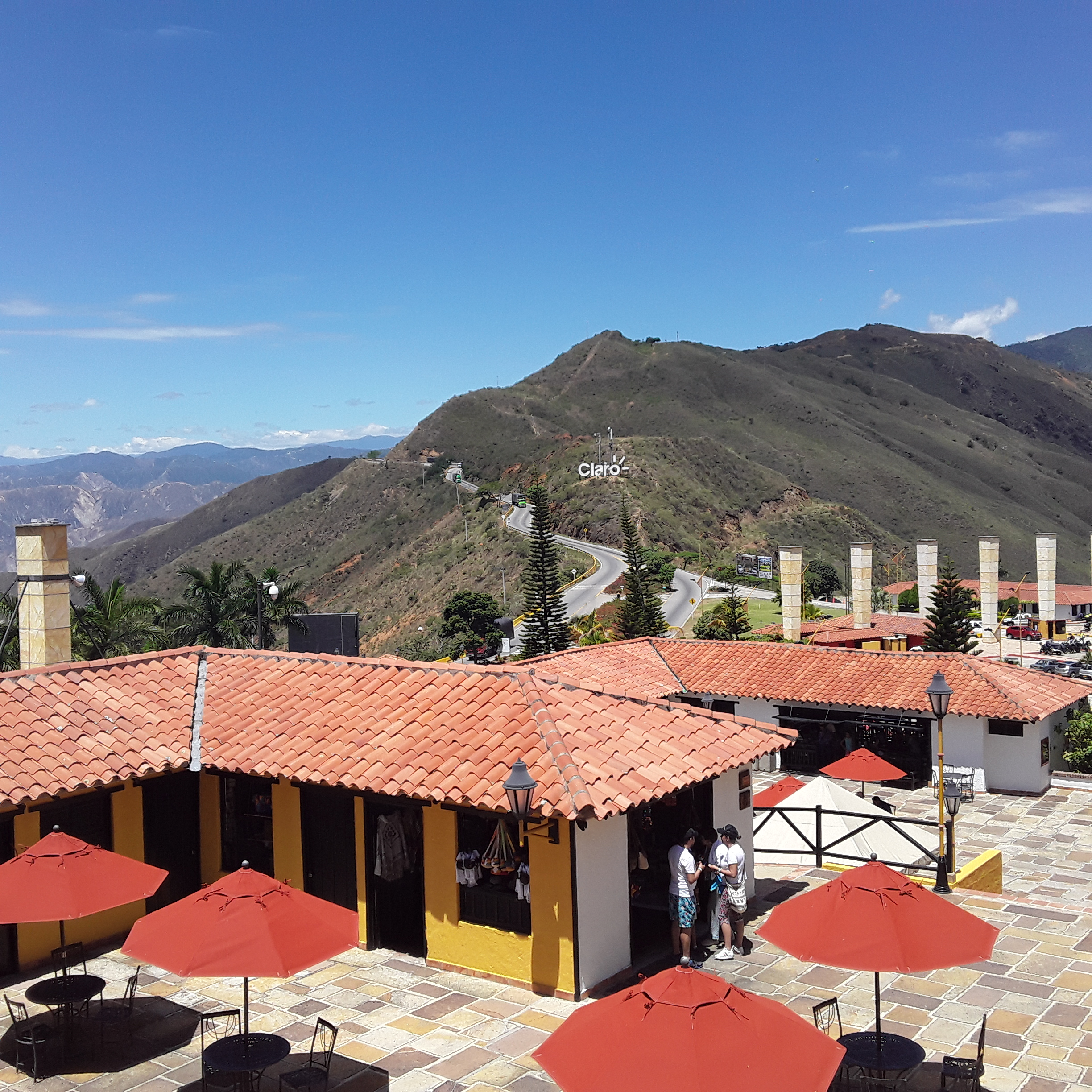

== Gallery ==
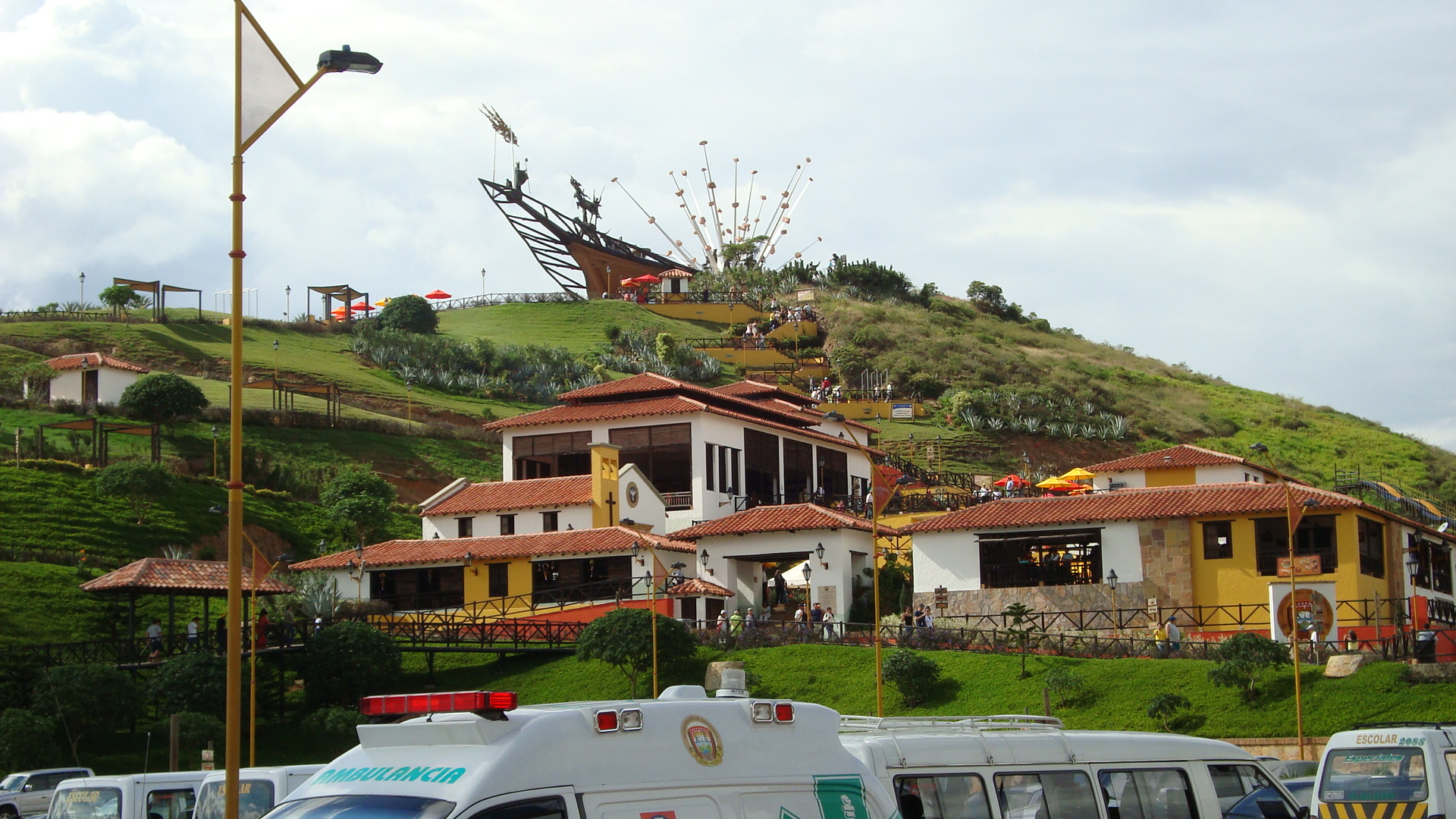
Santanderean architecture at the Chicamocha National Park

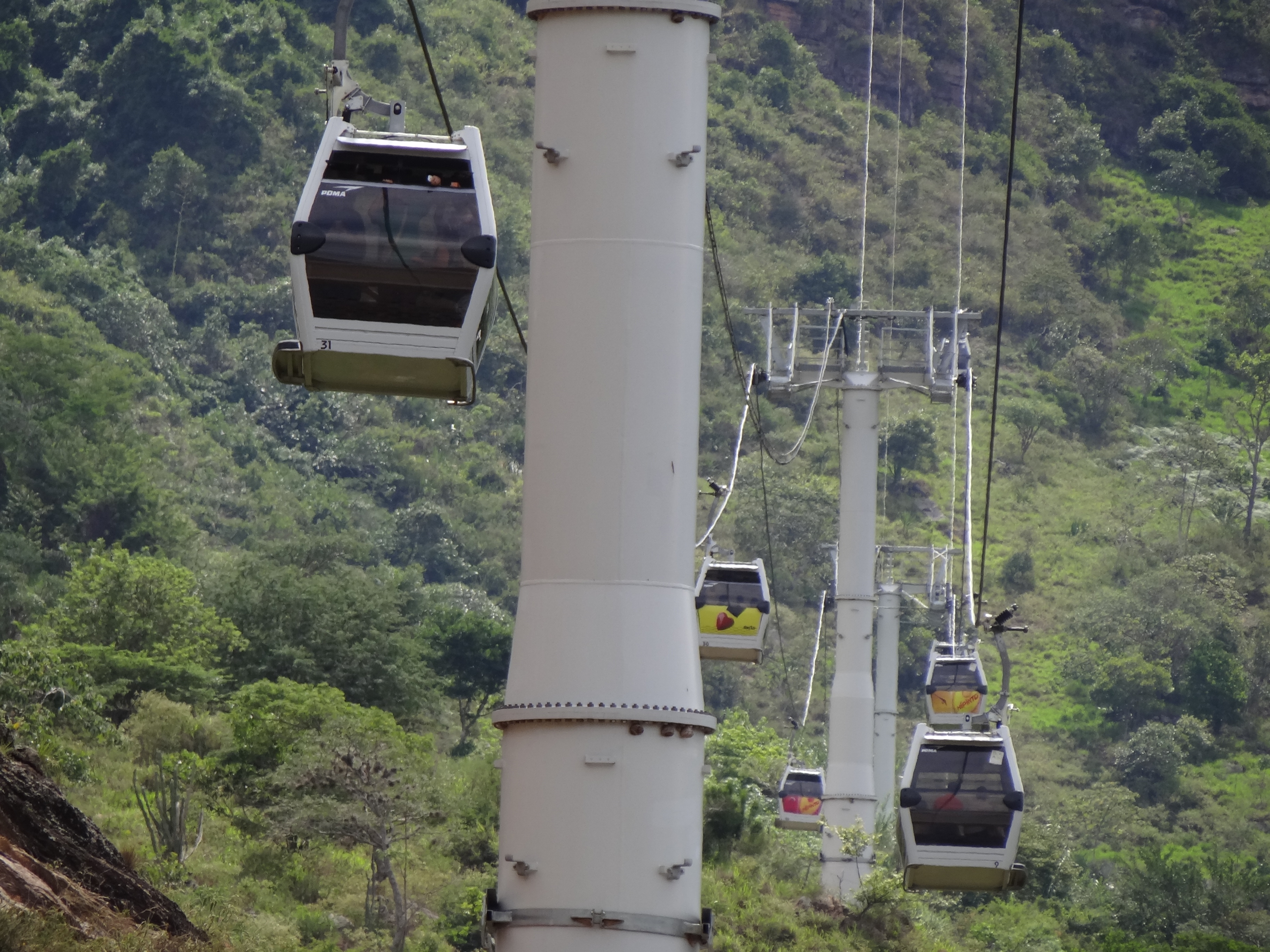
Tram

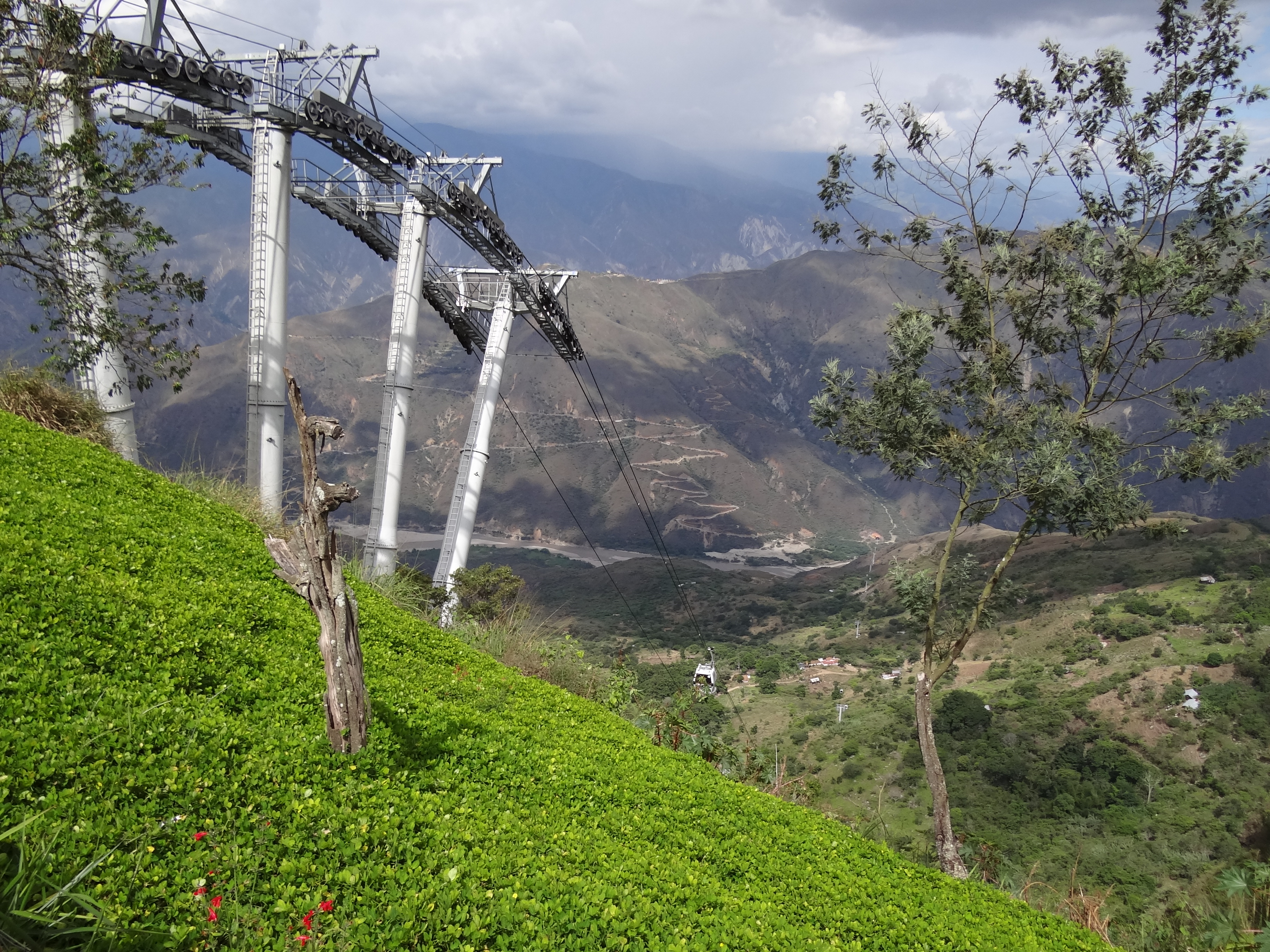
Tram

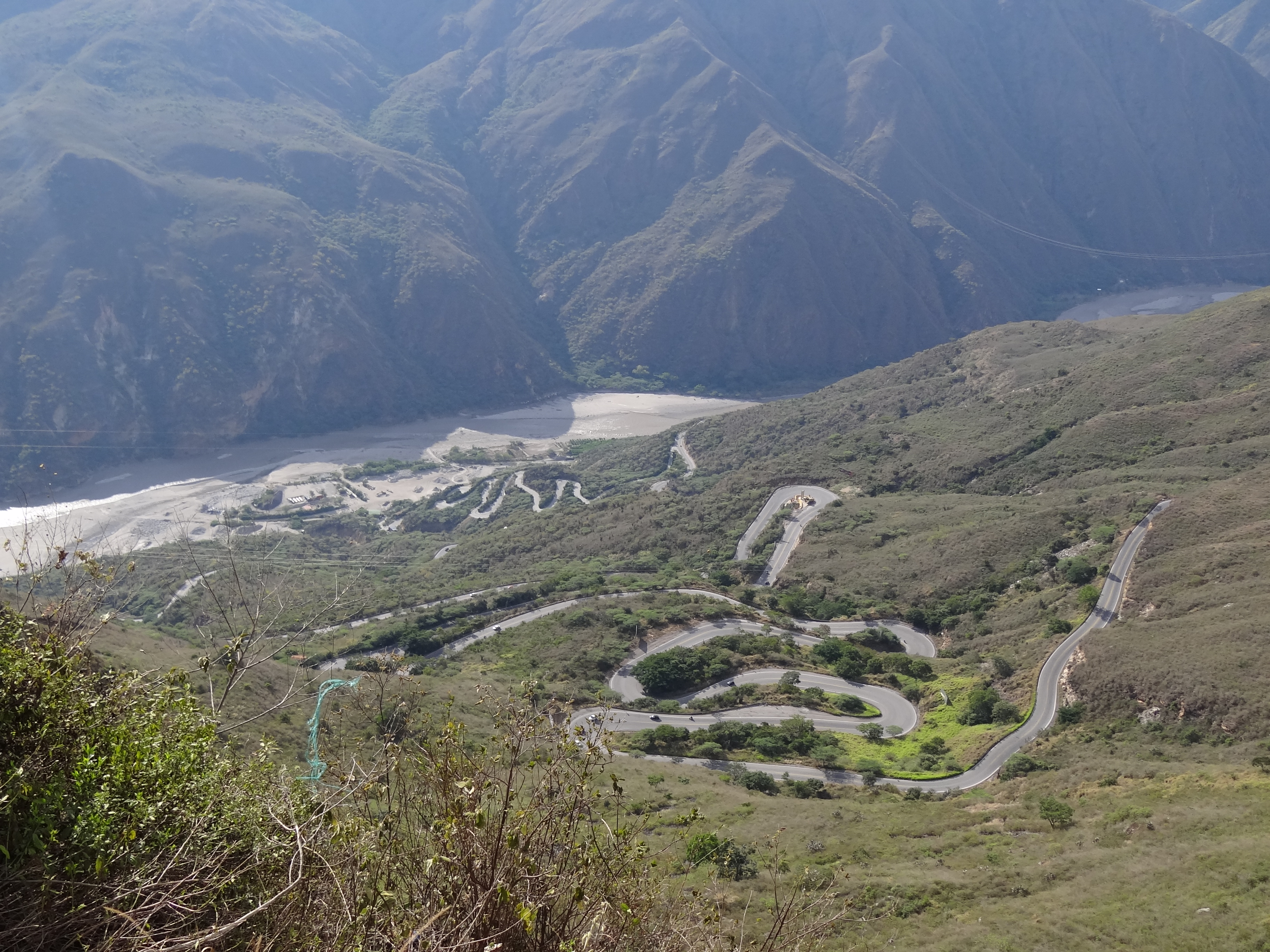
View of the canyon

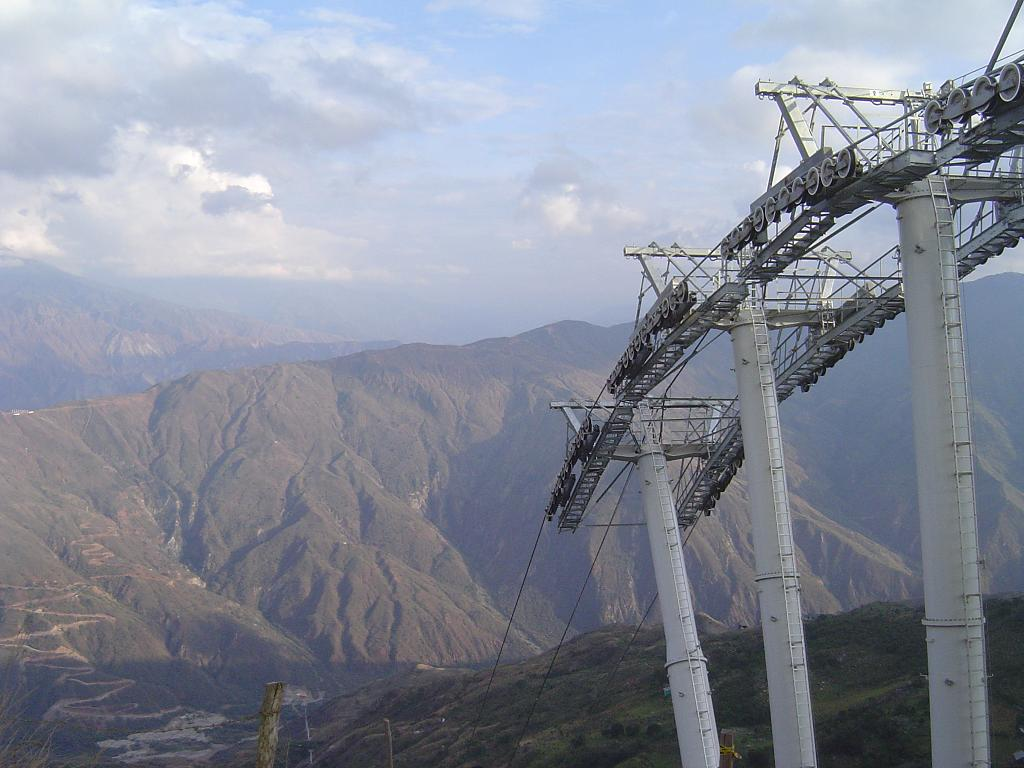
