= Fortuynia =

Fortuynia may refer to:

- Fortuynia (mite), a genus of mites in the family Fortuyniidae
- Fortuynia (plant), a genus of plants in the family Brassicaceae
