= Tunjuelo Formation =

Geologic formation in Colombia

- Stratigraphic range: Pleistocene; ~2.6–0.01 Ma
- Type: Geological formation
- Underlies: Chía Fm., Sabana Fm.
- Overlies: Marichuela Formation; Subachoque Formation
- Thickness: up to 150 metres (490 ft)

Lithology
- Primary: Conglomerate
- Other: Sandstone, shale

Location
- Coordinates: 4°28′04.0″N 74°08′11.9″W
- Region: Bogotá savanna, Altiplano Cundiboyacense; Eastern Ranges, Andes
- Country: Colombia

Type section
- Named for: Tunjuelo River
- Named by: Helmens & Hammen
- Location: Tunjuelo River valley
- Year defined: 1995
- Coordinates: 4°28′04.0″N 74°08′11.9″W
- Region: Cundinamarca
- Country: Colombia
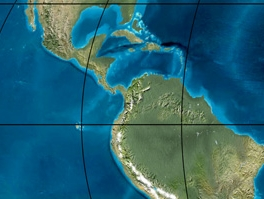
- Paleogeography of the Pleistocene by Ron Blakey

The Tunjuelo Formation, Río Tunjuelo or Río Tunjuelito Formation (Spanish: Formación Tunjuelo, Q_{1tu}, Qpt, Qcc) is a geological formation of the Bogotá savanna, Altiplano Cundiboyacense, Eastern Ranges of the Colombian Andes. The formation consists mainly of conglomerates with intercalating shales and sandstones. The Tunjuelo Formation dates to the Quaternary period; covering the complete Pleistocene epoch, and has a maximum thickness of 150 metres (490 ft). It is a formation of the lacustrine and fluvio-glacial sediments of Lake Humboldt.

== Etymology ==
The formation was first defined and named by Helmens and Van der Hammen in 1995 after the Tunjuelo River, also called Tunjuelito River, of southern Bogotá.

== Description ==
=== Lithologies ===
The Tunjuelo Formation consists mainly of conglomerates with intercalating shales and sandstones.

=== Stratigraphy and depositional environment ===
The Tunjuelo Formation conformably overlies the Marichuela Formation and in other parts the Subachoque Formation. The Tunjuelo Formation is overlain by the thin Chía Formation. The age has been estimated to be Pleistocene based on palynology and radiocarbon dating, covering the Pleistocene from 2.6 to 0.01 Ma. The depositional environment has been interpreted as fluvio-glacial terraces.

== Outcrops ==
Type locality of the Tunjuelo Formation to the south of the Bogotá savanna

The Tunjuelo Formation is found at its type locality in the Tunjuelo River valley, in the synclinal of Guasca, near Cogua, Cundinamarca, and in the basins of the rivers San Cristóbal, San Francisco, Arzobispo and Subachoque, and the creeks (quebradas) Las Delicias, La Vieja, Rosales and Chicó of the Colombian capital. In the Tunjuelo River valley, the formation is crossed by the northeast–southwest oriented Yerbabuena Fault.

== See also ==
Geology of the Eastern Hills
Geology of the Ocetá Páramo
Geology of the Altiplano Cundiboyacense
