= Sabana Formation =

Geological formation in the Colombian Andes

- Stratigraphic range: Mid to Late Pleistocene (Ensenadan-Lujanian); ~1.2–0.01 Ma
- Type: Geological formation
- Underlies: Holocene unconsolidated sediments
- Overlies: Subachoque Fm., Tilatá Fm.
- Area: ~4,500 km^{2} (1,700 sq mi)
- Thickness: up to 320 m (1,050 ft)

Lithology
- Primary: Shale
- Other: Lignite, sandstone, volcanic ash

Location
- Coordinates: 4°43′02.3″N 74°13′01.2″W
- Region: Bogotá savanna, Altiplano Cundiboyacense; Eastern Ranges, Andes
- Country: Colombia
- Extent: ~90 km × 40 km (56 mi × 25 mi)

Type section
- Named for: Bogotá savanna
- Named by: Helmens & Hammen
- Location: Funza II well
- Year defined: 1995
- Coordinates: 4°43′02.3″N 74°13′01.2″W
- Region: Cundinamarca
- Country: Colombia
- Thickness at type section: 317 m (1,040 ft)
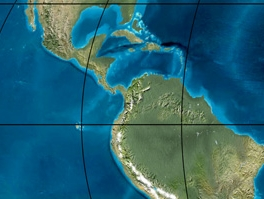
- Paleogeography of the Pleistocene by Ron Blakey

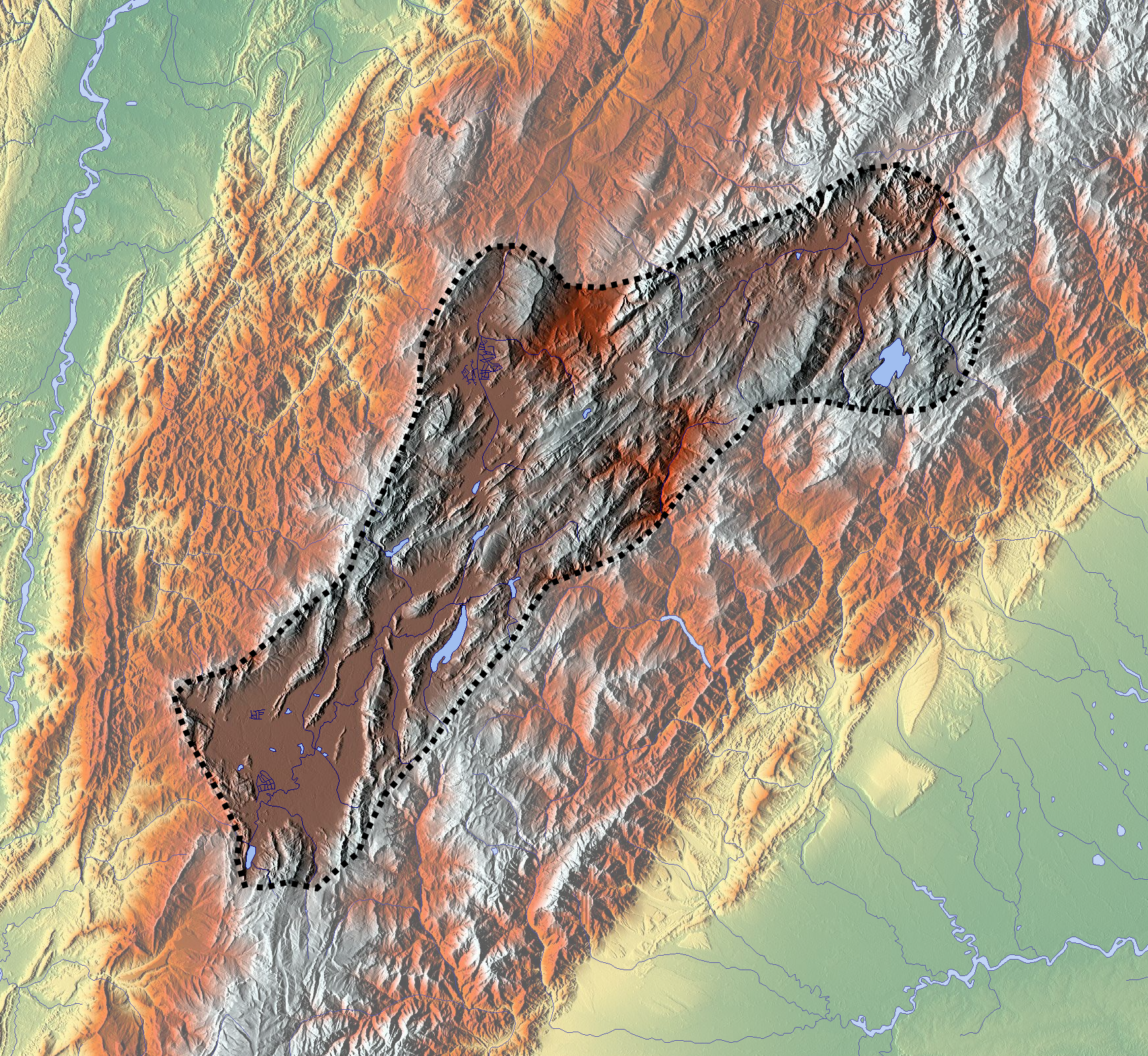
The Altiplano Cundiboyacense was formed late in the Andean orogenic phase

The Sabana Formation (Spanish: Formación Sabana, Q1_{sa}, QTs) is a geological formation of the Bogotá savanna, Altiplano Cundiboyacense, Eastern Ranges of the Colombian Andes. The formation consists mainly of shales with at the edges of the Bogotá savanna lignites and sandstones. The Sabana Formation dates to the Quaternary period; Middle to Late Pleistocene epoch, and has a maximum thickness of 320 metres (1,050 ft), varying greatly across the savanna. It is the uppermost formation of the lacustrine and fluvio-glacial sediments of paleolake Humboldt, that existed at the edge of the Eastern Hills until the latest Pleistocene.

The uppermost sediments of the Sabana Formation were deposited during the Last Glacial Maximum, a time when the first humans populated the Bogotá savanna. These hunter-gatherers used the bones of the still extant Pleistocene megafauna as Notiomastodon platensis, Cuvieronius hyodon and Equus neogeus, of which fossils have been found in the Sabana Formation.

Knowledge about the formation has been provided by geologists Alberto Guerrero, Thomas van der Hammen and others.

== Etymology ==
The formation was first defined and named after the Bogotá savanna (Sabana de Bogotá) by Hubach in 1957, further described by Van der Hammen in 1973, Guerrero (1992, 1993, 1996) and by Helmens and Van der Hammen in 1995.

== Regional setting ==
The Bogotá savanna is a slightly undulated montane savanna in the southwestern part of the Altiplano Cundiboyacense, a high plateau in the Eastern Ranges of the Colombian Andes. The Altiplano was formed during the latest stage of Andean uplift in the Plio-Pleistocene, exposing rocks of mainly Cretaceous to Paleogene ages at surface. A small massif of Paleozoic age is present in the northern part of the Altiplano; the Floresta Massif around Floresta comprising the fossiliferous formations Floresta and Cuche.

During the Mesozoic, the central part of Colombia was a rift basin to the west of the Guyana Shield, where series of marine platform deposits were deposited. The proto-Caribbean, the result of the break-up of Pangea, formed a long seaway into the South American Plate, up to Bolivia. During the Late Cretaceous, the Western and Central Ranges of the Colombian Andes began rising, while the Eastern Ranges was still absent. The main phase of tectonic uplift of the Eastern Ranges commenced in the Middle Miocene, marked by a change in paleocurrents of the fluvial deposits of the Honda Group, the most fossiliferous stratigraphic unit of Colombia.

Subduction of the Nazca Plate underneath western South America and the resulting compression in the continent created reversal of former extensional faults of the Mesozoic rift basin in the Eastern Ranges. A series of fold and thrust belts, oriented in a north–south to northeast–southwest sense, were formed in the Eastern Andes, uplifting the former marine strata and creating a high plateau between the western and eastern fronts; the Altiplano Cundiboyacense. The tectonic movements of this Andean orogenic phase are reflected in Upper Miocene units as the Marichuela Formation, underlying the Pliocene and Pleistocene sediments of which the Sabana Formation represents the final chapter.

== Description ==
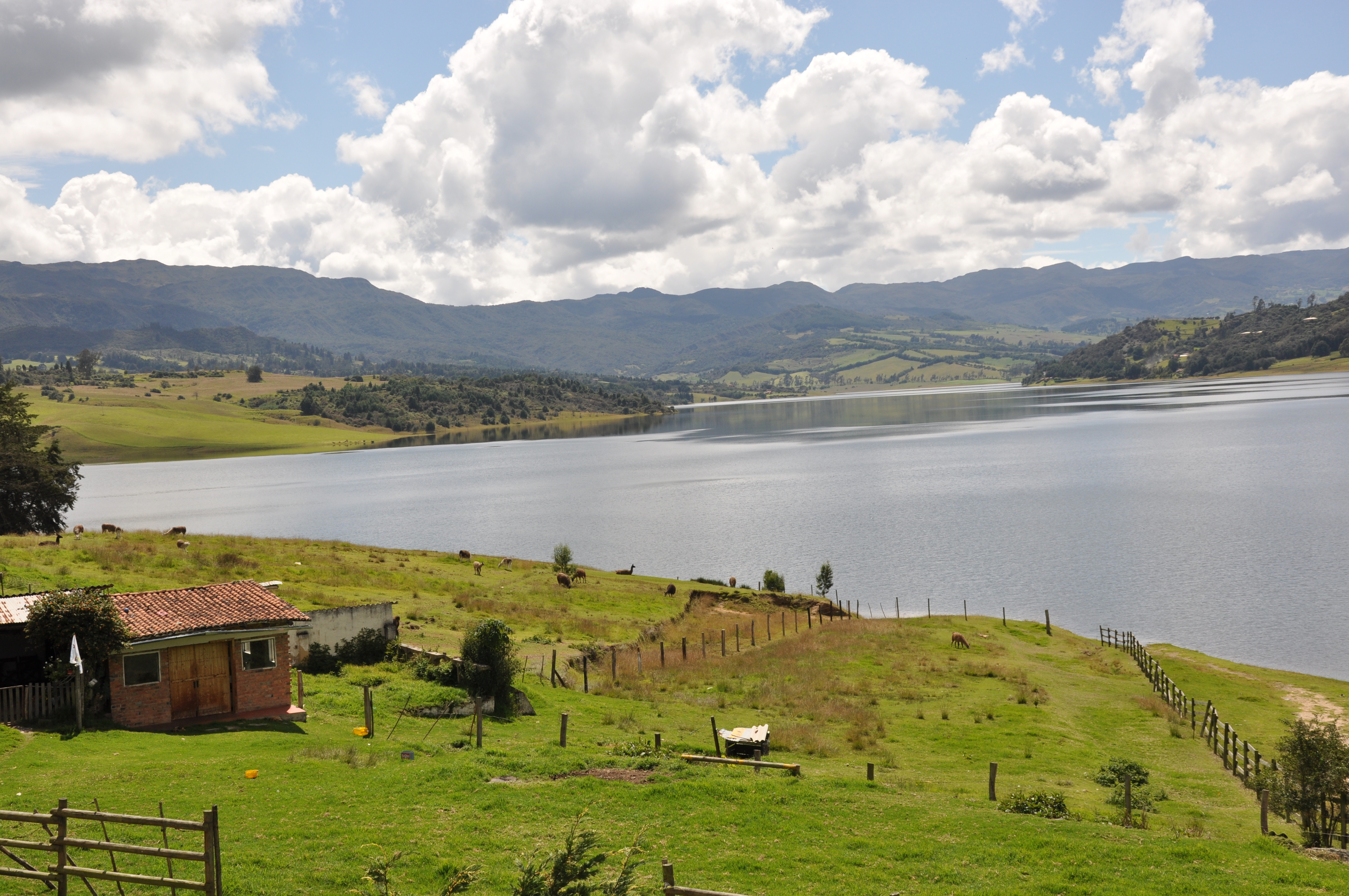
The Sabana Formation overlies the Tilatá Formation with type locality the Sisga Reservoir in Chocontá

=== Lithologies ===
The Sabana Formation consists mainly of horizontally bedded little consolidated grey and greenish shales with lignite and diatomites, and fine to coarse sandstones at the edges of the Bogotá savanna. Numerous volcanic ash deposits are noted in the Sabana Formation. Organic material is preserved in black soils and silts form the terraces of the central part of the savanna. The volcanic ash had as provenance area the Central Ranges of the Colombian Andes, with probably minor influences from the volcanic areas of Boyacá (Paipa–Iza volcanic complex). The diatomites are associated with the ash layers, a common feature in the geological record.

=== Stratigraphy ===
The Sabana Formation in some areas conformably overlies the Subachoque Formation, in other parts unconformably the Tilatá Formation, and is overlain by the alluvium of the Holocene, with the southeasternmost area of the savanna covered and intercalated by the fluvio-glacial deposits of the Tunjuelo Formation. The formation is subdivided into six units of alternating shales and fine sandstones. The age has been estimated to be Middle to Late Pleistocene, based on fission track analysis and radiocarbon dating. The Sabana Formation is time equivalent with the Soatá (upper Sabana), and Sogamoso Formations of the northern Altiplano, and the upper part of the Guayabo Formation of the Llanos Basin.

=== Depositional environment ===
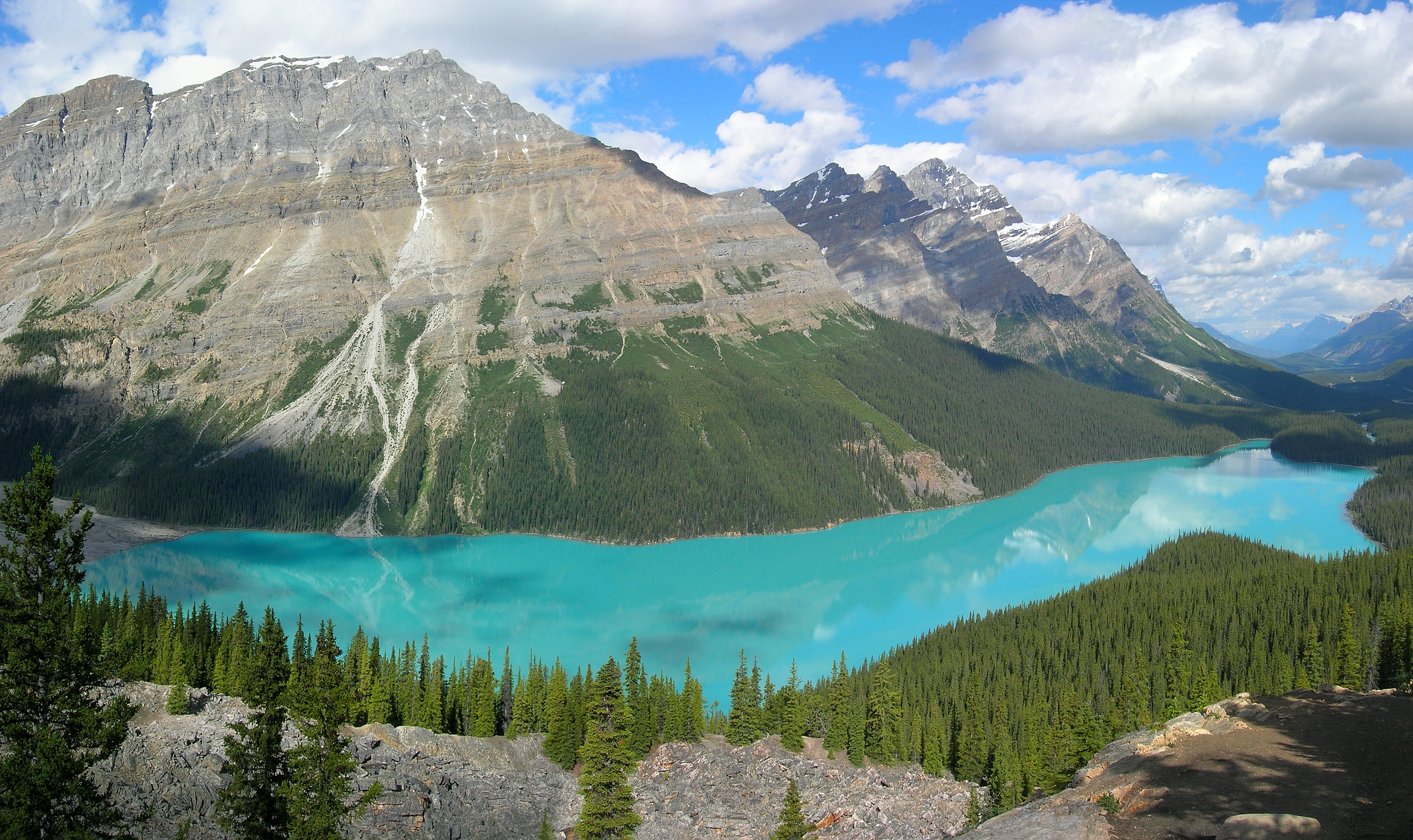
The Sabana Formation was deposited in a fluvio-glacial environment, extensive in the central part of the Bogotá savanna and narrow in the northern region

The depositional environment has been interpreted as lacustrine (Lake Humboldt) and fluvio-deltaic, with a near-continuous deposition since the Late Pliocene. The Sabana Formation represents the uppermost unit of the lacustrine deposition of Lake Humboldt. At the edges of the lake, numerous deltas of fluvio-glacial origin were present, reflected in the coarser sediments. During periods of stormy climate around the lake, coarser sediments were transported to the interior of the lake. The depositional cycles were geologically speaking fast and the water level of the lake fluctuated greatly during its history. Furthermore, the local tectonic activity of the Bogotá savanna, related to movements of the Bogotá Fault, influenced the depositional cycles. The middle unit of the formation shows a drying out of the lake and subaerial erosional surfaces. The upper part of the Sabana sequence is characterised by fluvial deposits around a retreating Lake Humboldt, estimated at an age of around 30,000 years BP. The glacial origin was predominantly the Sumapaz Páramo to the south of the Bogotá savanna, with minor snow-capped peaks in the Eastern Hills of Bogotá.

Present-day, the lakes of Fúquene, Herrera and Suesca are remnants of Lake Humboldt, as well as the many wetlands of Bogotá.

=== Paleoecology ===
The Sabana Formation was deposited during the Pleistocene glaciations and interglacials ("ice ages"). The fluctuations in climate in the Eastern Colombian Andes have been studied around Lake Fúquene at an altitude of 2,540 metres (8,330 ft), to the north of the Bogotá savanna. During the Last Glacial Maximum of the Pleistocene, the paleoecology of the region varied drastically, marking movements of the upper tree line and the types of vegetation. Pollen analysis shows that páramo vegetation was abundant from 30 ka to 17,500 years ago, with an increase in Andean forest frequency dated at 15.6 ka. Between 13,000 and 11,000 years BP, a decrease in Andean forest percentage is observed, indicative of a colder climate than before. This period has been named the Fúquene stadial. The stadial is followed by an interstadial (Guantivá), with an increase in lake levels of Lake Fúquene. The wetter periods of the interstadial covered earlier paleotopography with humic sediments.

During the last phase of deposition of the Sabana Formation, the Bogotá savanna was surrounded by populations of Pleistocene megafauna. Fossils of the ground sloths Megatherium and Eremotherium have been uncovered from Quipile, and Fusagasugá and Tocaima respectively, Notiomastodon platensis from Tocaima and Pubenza, accompanied by shells of Neocyclotus cf. cingulatus, to the west of the savanna, and Cuvieronius hyodon and Equus neogeus from the Sabana Formation at Tibitó. The migration of fauna was favoured by the existence of a dry corridor from the Magdalena River to the Eastern Ranges. Analysis of the fluorine in a fossil molar of a gomphothere, found in the Sabana Formation at Mosquera, provided an age between the last interglacial and the first stage of the last glacial of the Last Glacial Maximum. The fossils of Pubenza and Tibitó were dated at 16,300 ± 150 and 11,740 ± 110 years BP respectively. Researchers at the Universidade Federal do Estado do Rio de Janeiro, UNIRIO propose that all gomphotheres found in Colombia should be reassigned to a single species; Notiomastodon platensis. At the latest age of Tibitó, a páramo ecosystem was dominant.

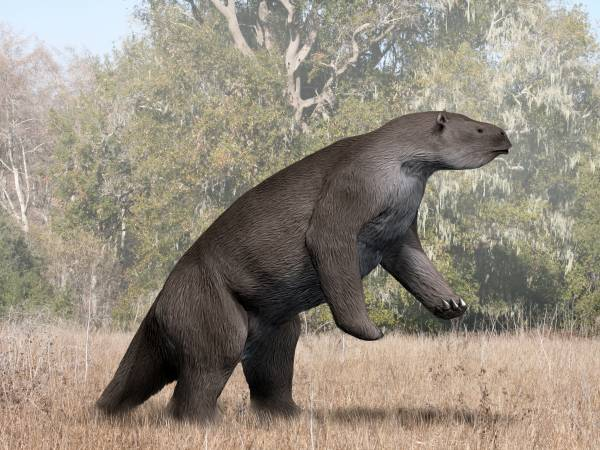
Megatherium

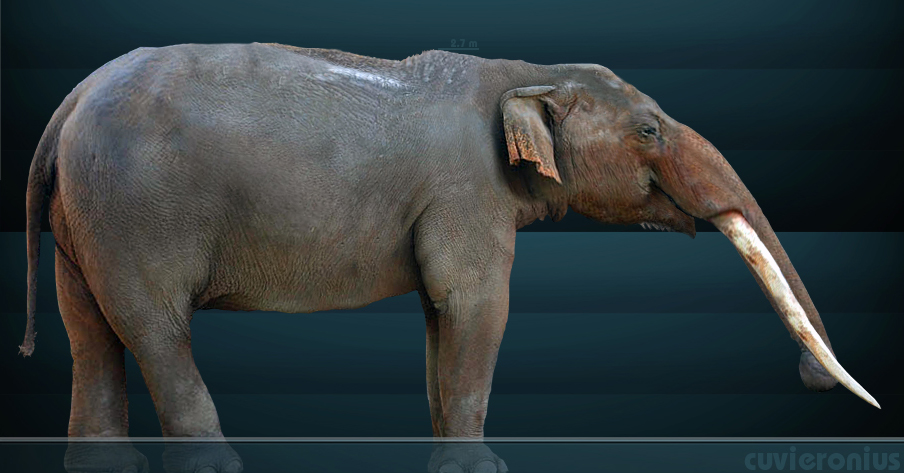
Cuvieronius

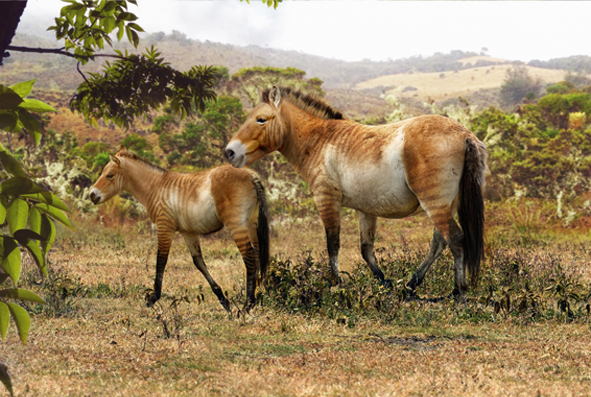
Equus neogeus

== Human settlement ==
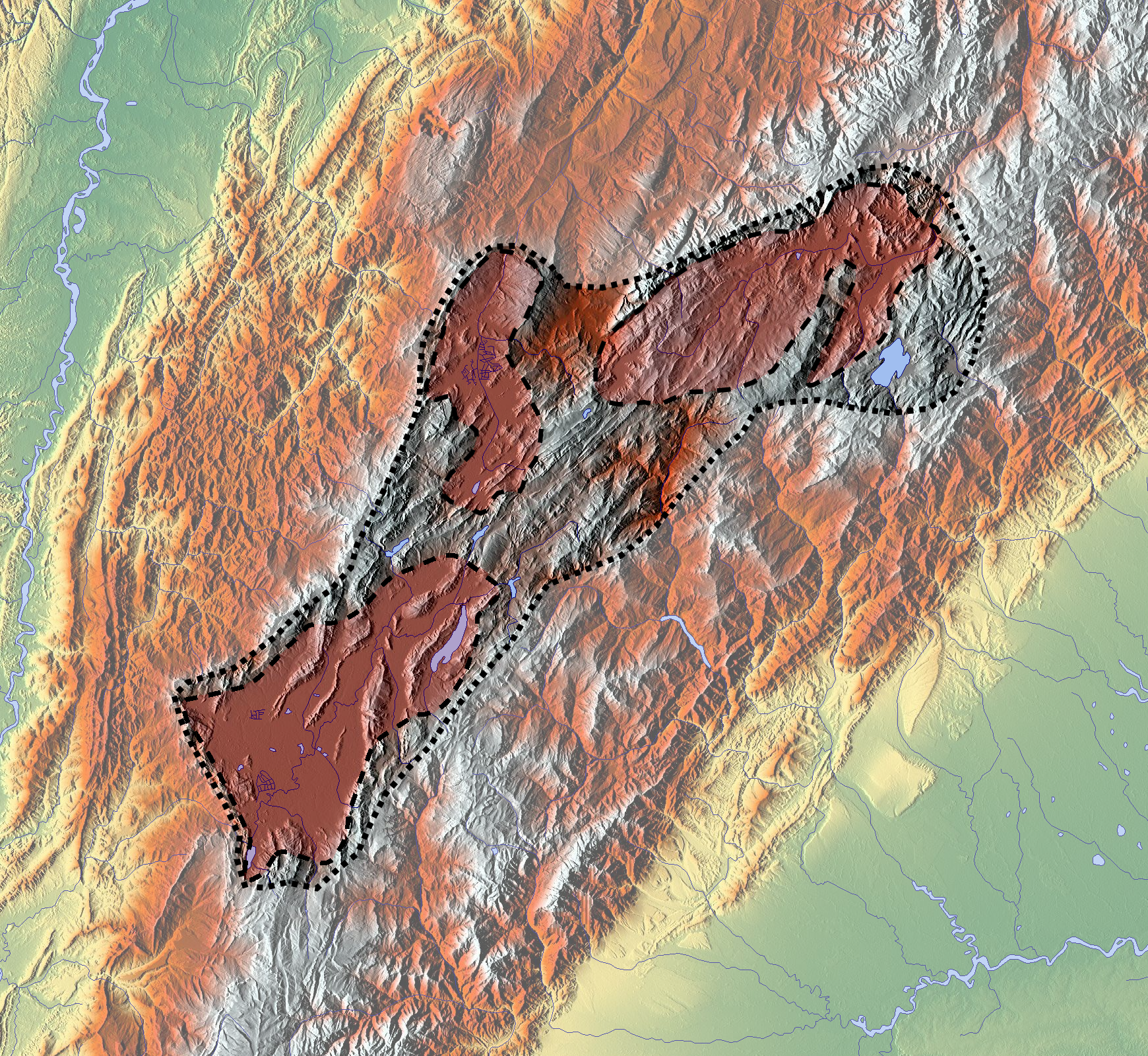
Main settlements of the Muisca Confederation on the Altiplano Cundiboyacense.
The location of the capital of the New Kingdom of Granada (Santafe de) Bogotá is different from its namesake, Bacatá

The latest sedimentation phase of the Sabana Formation, evidenced by the sites El Abra, Tibitó and Tequendama, was accompanied by the first confirmed human settlement in Colombia. Around 12,500 years BP, groups of hunter-gatherers populated the rock shelters surrounding the retreating Lake Humboldt. The people of the area hunted the still extant Pleistocene species, and used their remains for the construction of primitive settlements, as bone tools and the skins as clothing. At this stage, the timber line was 1,000 metres (3,300 ft) lower than today.

During the Holocene, the inhabitants of the Bogotá savanna gradually moved away from the rock shelters as permanent settlements in favour of more open area locations, as Checua and Aguazuque. Around 5000 years BP, agriculture became a more dominant phenomenon and the fertile clays mixed with volcanic ash of the Sabana Formation, combined with the bimodal pattern of seasonal precipitation made the Bogotá savanna an ideal area for growing crops. Pottery was used in the Herrera Period, from around 2800 years BP onwards, and the sediments of the Sabana Formation were used for various styles of ceramics, grouped by researchers based on the colour of the original clays. The northern settlement of Suesca was an important ceramic producing centre for the people. An advanced civilisation developed in the first and second millennia CE, leading to the Muisca Confederation, a loose collection of caciques. The southern Muisca area was centered around the Bogotá savanna with as main settlement Bacatá in the middle of the savanna, the namesake of the current capital of Colombia, Bogotá.

With the expansion in the late colonial and early republican era of the Colombian capital to the west and north of the city, the unconsolidated finer sediments of the Sabana Formation became more and more the foundation for construction, leading to problems due to the differential compaction of the sandy and more clay-rich strata.

== Outcrops ==
Type locality of the Sabana Formation on the Bogotá savanna

The Sabana Formation is found at its type locality in the Funza II well, and covering most of the Bogotá savanna. The newer parts of Bogotá, especially the neighbourhoods north of the Avenida Chile (Calle 72) in Chapinero and west of the Autopista Norte (Avenida 30), rest upon the Sabana Formation, where the unconsolidated shales cause frequent fissures in the roads constructed in the Colombian capital. The southeastern part of Bogotá, including the historic centre, rests upon the more competent Tunjuelo Formation.

== Regional correlations ==
Stratigraphy of the Llanos Basin and surrounding provinces
Ma	Age	Paleomap	Regional events	Catatumbo	Cordillera	proximal Llanos	distal Llanos	Putumayo	VSM	Environments	Maximum thickness	Petroleum geology	Notes
0.01	Holocene		Holocene volcanism Seismic activity	alluvium								Overburden	
1	Pleistocene		Pleistocene volcanism Andean orogeny 3 Glaciations	Guayabo	Soatá; Sabana	Necesidad	Guayabo	Gigante Neiva		Alluvial to fluvial (Guayabo)	550 m (1,800 ft) (Guayabo)	Overburden	
2.6	Pliocene		Pliocene volcanism Andean orogeny 3 GABI	Guayabo	Subachoque	Necesidad	Guayabo	Gigante Neiva		Alluvial to fluvial (Guayabo)	550 m (1,800 ft) (Guayabo)	Overburden	
5.3	Messinian		Andean orogeny 3 Foreland	Guayabo	Marichuela	Necesidad	Guayabo	Caimán	Honda	Alluvial to fluvial (Guayabo)	550 m (1,800 ft) (Guayabo)	Overburden	
13.5	Langhian		Regional flooding	León	hiatus	Caja	León	Caimán	Honda	Lacustrine (León)	400 m (1,300 ft) (León)	Seal	
16.2	Burdigalian		Miocene inundations Andean orogeny 2	C1	hiatus	Carbonera C1		Ospina	Honda	Proximal fluvio-deltaic (C1)	850 m (2,790 ft) (Carbonera)	Reservoir	
17.3	Burdigalian		Miocene inundations Andean orogeny 2	C2	hiatus	Carbonera C2		Ospina	Honda	Distal lacustrine-deltaic (C2)	850 m (2,790 ft) (Carbonera)	Seal	
19	Burdigalian		Miocene inundations Andean orogeny 2	C3	hiatus	Carbonera C3		Ospina	Honda	Proximal fluvio-deltaic (C3)	850 m (2,790 ft) (Carbonera)	Reservoir	
21	Early Miocene		Pebas wetlands	C4	hiatus	Carbonera C4		Ospina	Barzalosa	Distal fluvio-deltaic (C4)	850 m (2,790 ft) (Carbonera)	Seal	
23	Late Oligocene		Andean orogeny 1 Foredeep	C5	hiatus	Carbonera C5		Orito		Proximal fluvio-deltaic (C5)	850 m (2,790 ft) (Carbonera)	Reservoir	
25	Late Oligocene		Andean orogeny 1 Foredeep	C6	hiatus	Carbonera C6		Orito		Distal fluvio-lacustrine (C6)	850 m (2,790 ft) (Carbonera)	Seal	
28	Early Oligocene		Andean orogeny 1 Foredeep	C7	hiatus	C7		Pepino	Gualanday	Proximal deltaic-marine (C7)	850 m (2,790 ft) (Carbonera)	Reservoir	
32	Oligo-Eocene		Andean orogeny 1 Foredeep	C8	Usme	C8	onlap	Pepino	Gualanday	Marine-deltaic (C8)	850 m (2,790 ft) (Carbonera)	Seal; Source	
35	Late Eocene		Andean orogeny 1 Foredeep	Mirador	Usme	Mirador		Pepino	Gualanday	Coastal (Mirador)	240 m (790 ft) (Mirador)	Reservoir	
40	Middle Eocene		Andean orogeny 1 Foredeep	Mirador	Regadera	Mirador		Pepino	hiatus	Coastal (Mirador)	240 m (790 ft) (Mirador)	Reservoir	
45	Middle Eocene		Andean orogeny 1 Foredeep	Mirador	Regadera	Mirador		Pepino	hiatus	Coastal (Mirador)	240 m (790 ft) (Mirador)	Reservoir	
50	Early Eocene		Andean orogeny 1 Foredeep	Socha	Regadera	Los Cuervos		Pepino	hiatus	Deltaic (Los Cuervos)	260 m (850 ft) (Los Cuervos)	Seal; Source	
55	Late Paleocene		PETM; 2000 ppm CO_{2}	Los Cuervos	Bogotá	Los Cuervos		Pepino	Gualanday	Deltaic (Los Cuervos)	260 m (850 ft) (Los Cuervos)	Seal; Source	
60	Early Paleocene		SALMA	Barco	Guaduas	Barco		Rumiyaco	Gualanday	Fluvial (Barco)	225 m (738 ft) (Barco)	Reservoir	
65	Maastrichtian		KT extinction	Catatumbo	Guadalupe			Rumiyaco	Monserrate	Deltaic-fluvial (Guadalupe)	750 m (2,460 ft) (Guadalupe)	Reservoir	
72	Campanian		End of rifting	Colón-Mito Juan	Guadalupe			Rumiyaco	Monserrate	Deltaic-fluvial (Guadalupe)	750 m (2,460 ft) (Guadalupe)	Reservoir	
83	Santonian		End of rifting	Colón-Mito Juan	Guadalupe			Villeta/Güagüaquí		Deltaic-fluvial (Guadalupe)	750 m (2,460 ft) (Guadalupe)	Reservoir	
86	Coniacian		End of rifting	Colón-Mito Juan	Guadalupe			Villeta/Güagüaquí		Deltaic-fluvial (Guadalupe)	750 m (2,460 ft) (Guadalupe)	Reservoir	
89	Turonian		Cenomanian-Turonian anoxic event	La Luna	Chipaque	Gachetá	hiatus	Villeta/Güagüaquí		Restricted marine (all)	500 m (1,600 ft) (Gachetá)	Source	
93	Cenomanian		Rift 2	La Luna	Chipaque	Gachetá	hiatus	Villeta/Güagüaquí		Restricted marine (all)	500 m (1,600 ft) (Gachetá)	Source	
100	Albian		Rift 2	La Luna	Une	Une	hiatus	Caballos		Deltaic (Une)	500 m (1,600 ft) (Une)	Reservoir	
113	Aptian		Rift 2	Capacho	Fómeque	Une	hiatus	Motema	Yaví	Open marine (Fómeque)	800 m (2,600 ft) (Fómeque)	Source (Fóm)	
125	Barremian		High biodiversity	Aguardiente	Paja	Une	hiatus	Motema	Yaví	Shallow to open marine (Paja)	940 m (3,080 ft) (Paja)	Reservoir	
129	Hauterivian		Rift 1	Tibú- Mercedes	Las Juntas	hiatus	hiatus	Motema	Yaví	Deltaic (Las Juntas)	910 m (2,990 ft) (Las Juntas)	Reservoir (LJun)	
133	Valanginian		Rift 1	Río Negro	Cáqueza; Macanal; Rosablanca	hiatus	hiatus	Motema	Yaví	Restricted marine (Macanal)	2,935 m (9,629 ft) (Macanal)	Source (Mac)	
140	Berriasian		Rift 1	Girón	Cáqueza; Macanal; Rosablanca	hiatus	hiatus	Motema	Yaví	Restricted marine (Macanal)	2,935 m (9,629 ft) (Macanal)	Source (Mac)	
145	Tithonian		Break-up of Pangea	Jordán	Arcabuco	Buenavista Batá	hiatus	Saldaña		Alluvial, fluvial (Buenavista)	110 m (360 ft) (Buenavista)	"Jurassic"	
150	Early-Mid Jurassic		Passive margin 2	La Quinta	Montebel Noreán	hiatus	hiatus	Saldaña		Coastal tuff (La Quinta)	100 m (330 ft) (La Quinta)	"Jurassic"	
201	Late Triassic		Passive margin 2	Mucuchachi	Montebel Noreán	hiatus	hiatus	Payandé				"Jurassic"	
235	Early Triassic		Pangea		hiatus	hiatus	hiatus					"Paleozoic"	
250	Permian		Pangea		hiatus	hiatus	hiatus					"Paleozoic"	
300	Late Carboniferous		Famatinian orogeny		hiatus	hiatus	hiatus		Cerro Neiva ()			"Paleozoic"	
340	Early Carboniferous		Fossil fish Romer's gap		Cuche (355-385)	Farallones ()			Cerro Neiva ()	Deltaic, estuarine (Cuche)	900 m (3,000 ft) (Cuche)	"Paleozoic"	
360	Late Devonian		Passive margin 1	Río Cachirí (360-419)	Cuche (355-385)	Farallones ()			Ambicá ()	Alluvial-fluvial-reef (Farallones)	2,400 m (7,900 ft) (Farallones)	"Paleozoic"	
390	Early Devonian		High biodiversity	Floresta (387-400) El Tíbet					Ambicá ()	Shallow marine (Floresta)	600 m (2,000 ft) (Floresta)	"Paleozoic"	
410	Late Silurian		Silurian mystery	Floresta (387-400) El Tíbet								"Paleozoic"	
425	Early Silurian		Silurian mystery	hiatus								"Paleozoic"	
440	Late Ordovician		Rich fauna in Bolivia	San Pedro (450-490)		Duda ()						"Paleozoic"	
470	Early Ordovician		First fossils	San Pedro (450-490)	Busbanzá (>470±22) Chuscales Otengá	Guape ()		Río Nevado ()	Hígado () Agua Blanca; Venado (470-475)			"Paleozoic"	
488	Late Cambrian		Regional intrusions	Chicamocha (490-515)	Quetame ()	Ariarí ()		SJ del Guaviare (490-590)	San Isidro ()			"Paleozoic"	
515	Early Cambrian		Cambrian explosion		Quetame ()			SJ del Guaviare (490-590)	San Isidro ()			"Paleozoic"	
542	Ediacaran		Break-up of Rodinia		pre-Quetame		post-Parguaza	SJ del Guaviare (490-590)	El Barro ()	Yellow: allochthonous basement (Chibcha terrane); Green: autochthonous basement (Río Negro-Juruena Province)		Basement	
600	Neoproterozoic		Cariri Velhos orogeny	Bucaramanga (600-1400)	pre-Quetame		post-Parguaza	pre-Guaviare	El Barro ()	Yellow: allochthonous basement (Chibcha terrane); Green: autochthonous basement (Río Negro-Juruena Province)		Basement	
800	Neoproterozoic		Snowball Earth	Bucaramanga (600-1400)	pre-Quetame		post-Parguaza	pre-Guaviare	El Barro ()	Yellow: allochthonous basement (Chibcha terrane); Green: autochthonous basement (Río Negro-Juruena Province)		Basement	
1000	Mesoproterozoic		Sunsás orogeny	Bucaramanga (600-1400)	pre-Quetame	Ariarí (1000)	post-Parguaza	pre-Guaviare	La Urraca (1030-1100)	Yellow: allochthonous basement (Chibcha terrane); Green: autochthonous basement (Río Negro-Juruena Province)		Basement	
1300	Mesoproterozoic		Rondônia-Juruá orogeny	Bucaramanga (600-1400)	pre-Quetame	pre-Ariarí	Parguaza (1300-1400)	pre-Guaviare	Garzón (1180-1550)	Yellow: allochthonous basement (Chibcha terrane); Green: autochthonous basement (Río Negro-Juruena Province)		Basement	
1400	Mesoproterozoic		Rondônia-Juruá orogeny	pre-Bucaramanga	pre-Quetame	pre-Ariarí		pre-Guaviare	Garzón (1180-1550)	Yellow: allochthonous basement (Chibcha terrane); Green: autochthonous basement (Río Negro-Juruena Province)		Basement	
1600	Paleoproterozoic		Rondônia-Juruá orogeny	pre-Bucaramanga	pre-Quetame	pre-Ariarí	Maimachi (1500-1700)	pre-Guaviare	pre-Garzón	Yellow: allochthonous basement (Chibcha terrane); Green: autochthonous basement (Río Negro-Juruena Province)		Basement	
1800	Paleoproterozoic		Tapajós orogeny	pre-Bucaramanga	pre-Quetame	pre-Ariarí	Mitú (1800)	pre-Guaviare	pre-Garzón	Yellow: allochthonous basement (Chibcha terrane); Green: autochthonous basement (Río Negro-Juruena Province)		Basement	
1950	Paleoproterozoic		Transamazonic orogeny	pre-Bucaramanga	pre-Quetame	pre-Ariarí	pre-Mitú	pre-Guaviare	pre-Garzón	Yellow: allochthonous basement (Chibcha terrane); Green: autochthonous basement (Río Negro-Juruena Province)		Basement	
2200	Paleoproterozoic		Columbia	pre-Bucaramanga	pre-Quetame	pre-Ariarí	pre-Mitú	pre-Guaviare	pre-Garzón	Yellow: allochthonous basement (Chibcha terrane); Green: autochthonous basement (Río Negro-Juruena Province)		Basement	
2530	Archean		Carajas-Imataca orogeny	pre-Bucaramanga	pre-Quetame	pre-Ariarí	pre-Mitú	pre-Guaviare	pre-Garzón	Yellow: allochthonous basement (Chibcha terrane); Green: autochthonous basement (Río Negro-Juruena Province)		Basement	
3100	Archean		Kenorland	pre-Bucaramanga	pre-Quetame	pre-Ariarí	pre-Mitú	pre-Guaviare	pre-Garzón	Yellow: allochthonous basement (Chibcha terrane); Green: autochthonous basement (Río Negro-Juruena Province)		Basement	

Legend

- group
- important formation
- fossiliferous formation
- minor formation
- (age in Ma)
- proximal Llanos (Medina) (Note: based on Duarte et al. (2019), García González et al. (2009), and geological report of Villavicencio)
- distal Llanos (Saltarin 1A well) (Note: based on Duarte et al. (2019) and the hydrocarbon potential evaluation performed by the UIS and ANH in 2009)

== See also ==
Geology of the Eastern Hills
Geology of the Ocetá Páramo
Geology of the Altiplano Cundiboyacense
