= Cuche Formation =

Geological formation in the Colombian Andes

- Stratigraphic range: Frasnian-Early Carboniferous; ~385–355 Ma
- Type: Geological formation
- Unit of: Floresta Massif
- Underlies: Girón Fm., Tibasosa Fm.
- Overlies: Floresta Formation
- Area: ~36 km^{2} (14 sq mi)
- Thickness: 300–900 m (980–2,950 ft)

Lithology
- Primary: Sandstone, siltstone
- Other: Shale

Location
- Coordinates: 5°51′37.2″N 72°56′57.6″W
- Region: Altiplano Cundiboyacense; Eastern Ranges, Andes
- Country: Colombia

Type section
- Named for: Vereda Cuche
- Named by: Botero
- Location: Floresta
- Year defined: 1950
- Coordinates: 5°51′37.2″N 72°56′57.6″W
- Approximate paleocoordinates: 51.7°S 48.1°W
- Region: Boyacá
- Country: Colombia
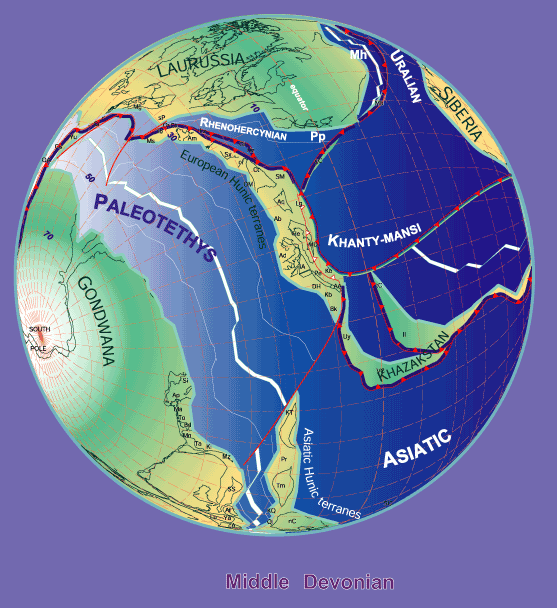
- Paleogeography of the Middle Devonian; 380 Ma, by Stampfli & Borel

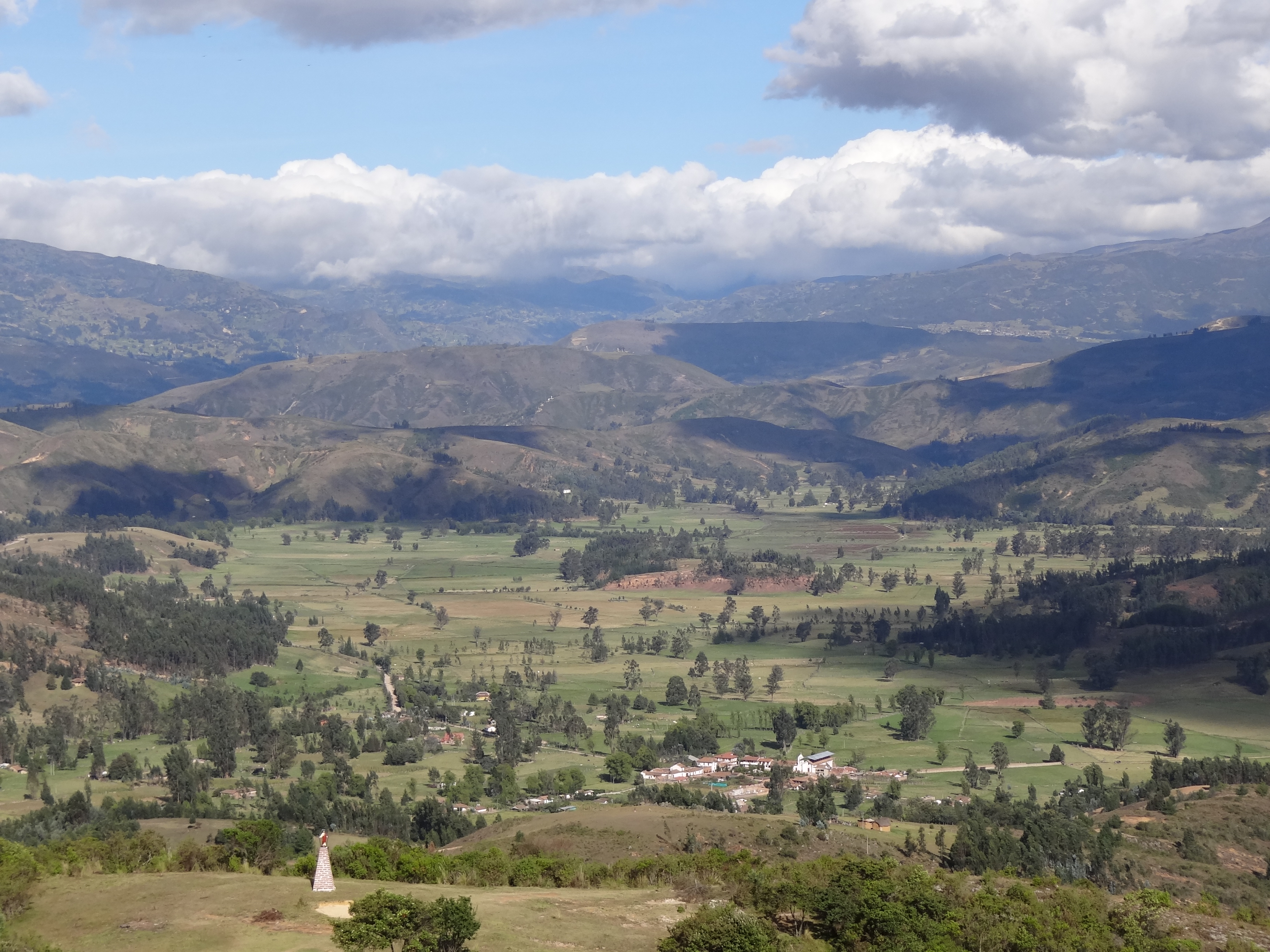
Contrasting with the original coastal depositional environment, the Cuche Formation is found at altitudes of more than 2,500 metres (8,200 ft) in the Eastern Colombian Andes around Floresta, Boyacá

The Cuche Formation (Spanish: Formación Cuche, Cc) is a geological formation of the Floresta Massif, Altiplano Cundiboyacense in the Eastern Ranges of the Colombian Andes. The sequence of siltstones, shales, and sandstone beds dates to the Late Devonian and Early Carboniferous periods, and has a maximum thickness of 900 metres (3,000 ft).

The formation was deposited in a tidal-dominated deltaic environment at high southern paleolatitudes at the edge of the Paleozoic Paleo-Tethys Ocean. The Cuche Formation is highly fossiliferous; many Placoderm fish fossils, flora, bivalves, arthropods, crustaceans and ostracods have been discovered in the youngest Paleozoic strate of the Floresta Massif, while the underlying Floresta Formation is richer in trilobite biodiversity.

== Etymology ==
The formation was first described as part of the Floresta Series by Olsson and Carter in 1939. The current definition was given by Botero in 1950. The formation is named after the vereda Cuche of Floresta, Boyacá, where the formation outcrops. The word Cuche is taken from Muysccubun, the language of the indigenous Muisca, who inhabited the Altiplano Cundiboyacense before the Spanish conquest.

== Regional setting ==
The Floresta Massif is a block in the northern part of the Altiplano Cundiboyacense, marked by a metamorphic crystalline core overlain by Devonian to Carboniferous sedimentary sequences; from old to young, the El Tíbet, Floresta and Cuche Formations. The Paleozoic succession is overlain by sediments of much younger date; the Late Jurassic Girón and Early Cretaceous Tibasosa Formations. The massif is bound to the east by the Soapaga Fault and to the west by the Boyacá Fault.

At time of deposition of the Devonian formations, present-day northern South America was located at the edge of the Paleo-Tethys Ocean on the southern hemisphere. The Paleozoic occurrence on the Altiplano is localized in outcrop; the majority of surface sediments are Cretaceous to Paleogene in age. Neogene uplift of the Eastern Ranges, with its main phase in the Plio-Pleistocene, caused the exhumation of older units at surface along major thrust faults in the Eastern Andes. In two phases during the Paleozoic, intrusions occurred into the sedimentary sequence, causing local metamorphism. The first phase is considered pre-Devonian and the latter phase post-Devonian. The remaining stratigraphy of the Cuche Formation appears little affected by this intrusive phase, although slight metamorphism has been identified in later research.

== Description ==
=== Lithologies ===
The Cuche Formation is characterised by mostly cream and purple coloured shales, with a basal unit of micaceous siltstones with intercalated yellowish-grey shales and 30 metres (98 ft) thick quartzitic and feldspar-rich sandstone beds that colour red caused by meteoric waters. The sandstones have an iron-rich cementation. A middle unit of fine-grained sandstones with thin banks of siltstones follows the lower part and an upper sequence of shales with interbedded ferruginous red beds. The lower sequence contains runzelmark syn-sedimentary structures.

=== Stratigraphy and depositional environment ===
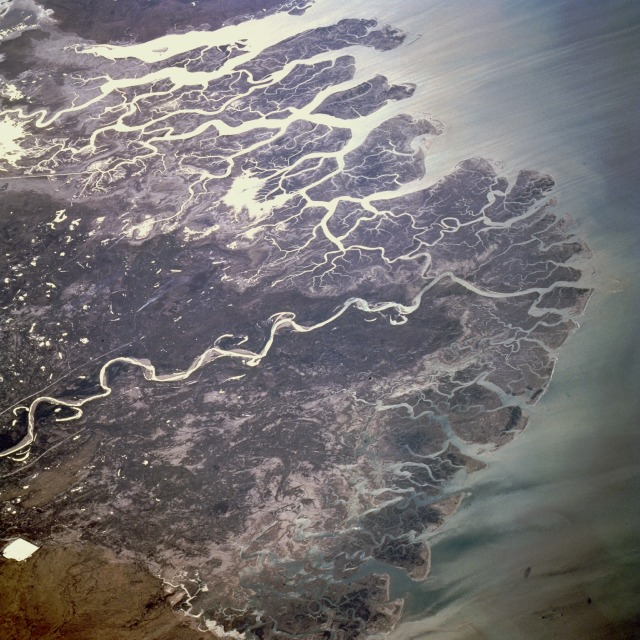
The depositional environment of the Cuche Formation has been analysed to be a low-energy tidal-dominated deltaic setting, with frequent marine incursions into continental and lagoonal areas marked by the presence of both the flora and the many fish species found in the formation

The Cuche Formation in some places discordantly and in other areas transitionally defined by colour changes, overlies the Floresta Formation in Boyacá and the Mogotes Formation in Santander, and is, by an angular unconformity up to 60 degrees, overlain by the Upper Jurassic Girón, and Early Cretaceous Tibasosa Formations. The angular unconformity between the Paleozoic and Mesozoic is exposed along the road between Duitama and Sogamoso, and is the location where the first flora fossils were found in 1978.

The age of the Cuche Formation has been estimated to be Late Devonian to Early Carboniferous, after an original designation as Permian-Carboniferous by Botero in 1950, further restricted to the Carboniferous by Julivert in 1968. The formation covers an area of approximately 36 square kilometres (14 sq mi) and ranges in thickness between 300 and 900 metres (980 and 2,950 ft). Stratigraphically, the Cuche Formation is time equivalent with the Diamante Formation of the Santander Massif to the north of the Altiplano Cundiboyacense. To the west of Paz de Río, the Cuche Formation is thrusted upon the Neogene Concentración Formation by the Soapaga Fault. In the northern part of the Floresta Massif, the contact between the metamorphic Otengá Stock and the Cuche Formation is formed by the Duga Fault.

Based on the preservation of fossils, the lithologies, syn-sedimentary structures and stratigraphic position, a depositional environment of shallow low energy waters has been proposed, possibly in a lagoonal setting at the edge of a regressional Paleo-Tethys Ocean. Other parts of the Cuche Formation were deposited in a continental environment, evidenced by the red beds and absence of marine fossils and abundant root imprints. Overall, the sequence represents a coastal deltaic environment with frequent marine incursions, a tidal deltaic setting.

== Fossil content ==
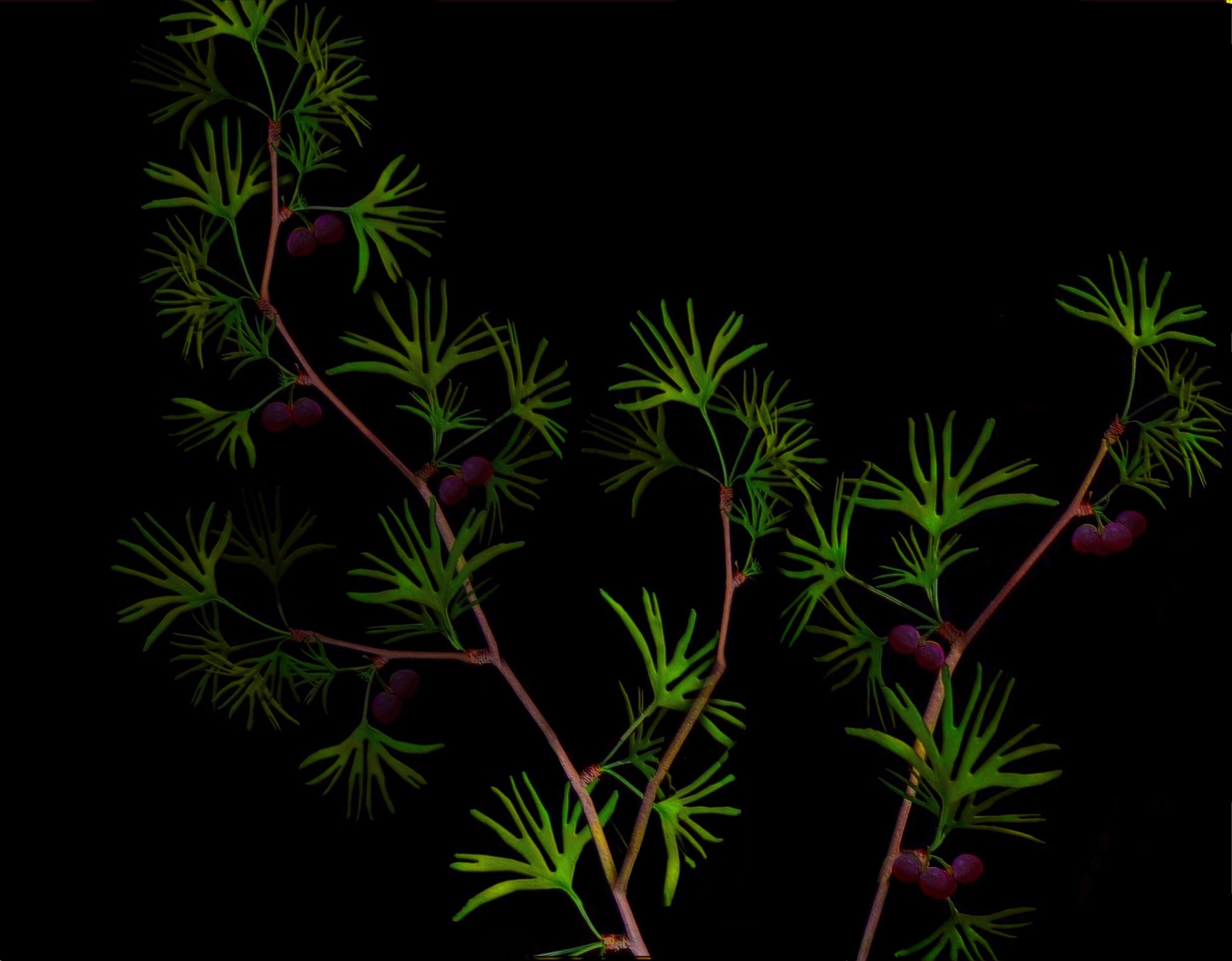
Fossil flora from the Cuche Formation were identified as "Ginkgo-like" species, as this Baiera reconstruction. Proper Ginkgo do not appear in the geological record until the Middle Permian

The first identification of fossil content of the Cuche Formation was done by Botero, who studied the formation in 1950. Research in the early 1980s revealed the presence of many more fossils in the formation and among the first fossil flora found were species then identified as the genera Ginkgo and Baiera. The lower units show poorly preserved plant remains and the overlying shales provided arthropods and crustaceans. In the middle units of the formation, more and better preserved plant fossils were found alongside bivalves, ostracods (of the genus Welleria) and arthropods.

The Cuche Formation contains unique Placoderm fish fossils, first noted by Mojica and Villarroel in 1984. Across the section, also plant fossils and bivalves are found. In this part of the sequence the first fish fossils were discovered. The top section provided brachiopods (genus Lingula) and other at that moment undetermined fossil fragments.

Later research has provided more insight into the flora of the formation, with the "Ginkgo" species possibly a Ginkgophyton sp.. Additionally, fossil flora of Colpodexylon cf. deatsii and cf. Archaeopteris sp. have been described from the formation. In the continental sandstone facies of the Cuche Formation, ichnofossils of Diplichnites have been described.

=== Fishes ===
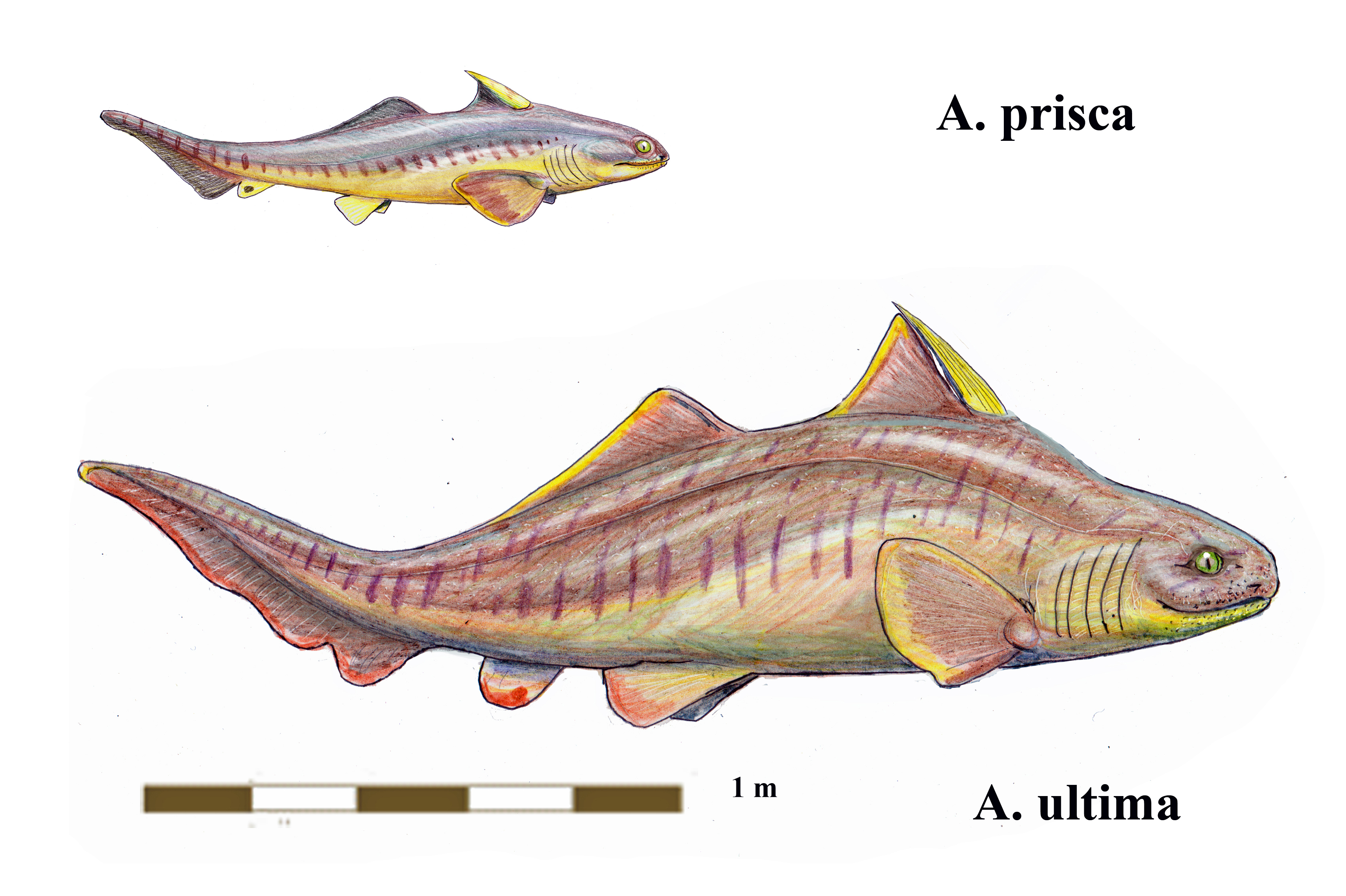
Antarctilamna (Gondwanan)

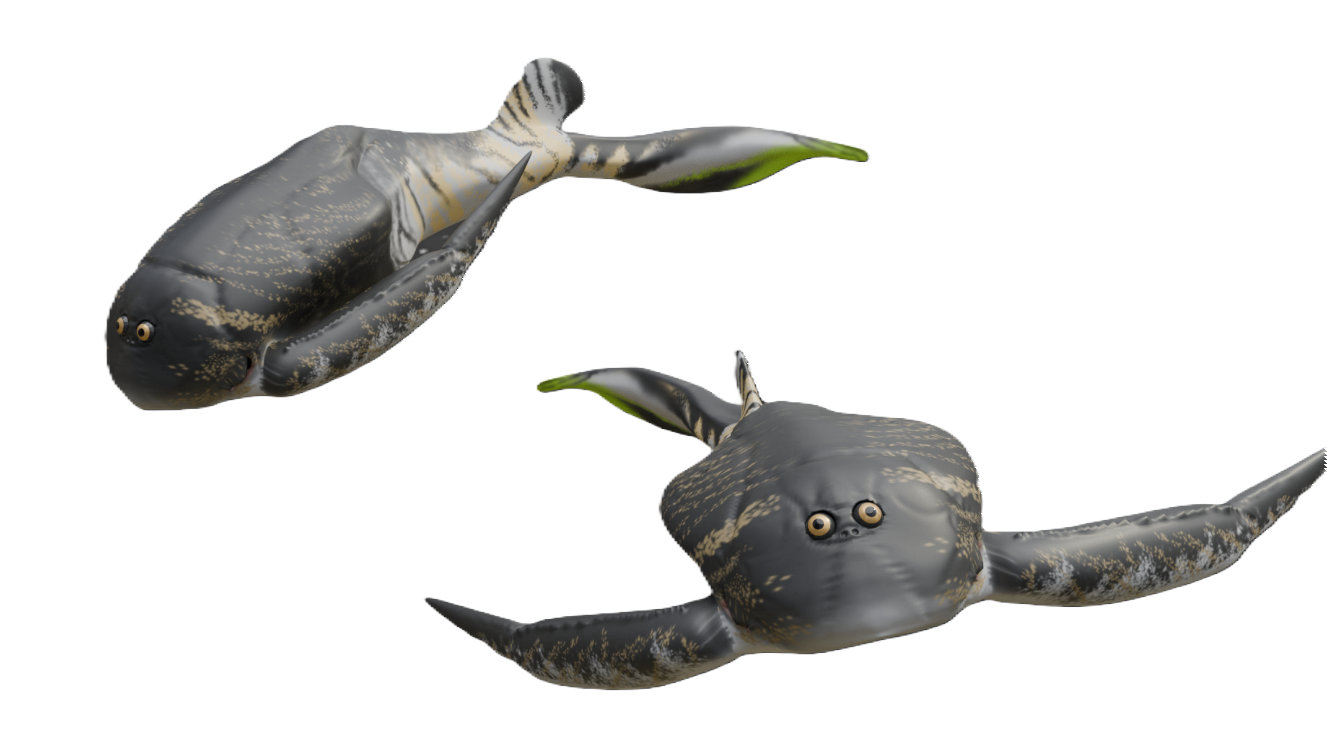
Bothriolepis (Euramerican)

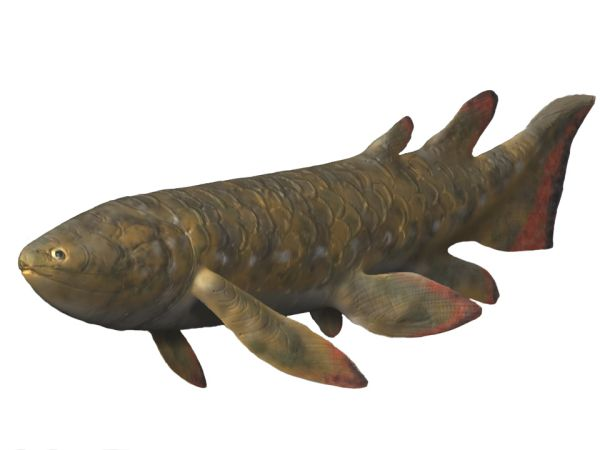
Holoptychius (Euramerican)

The fossil assemblage of the Cuche Formation is unique in the mixture of typical Euramerican (Laurussian) and Gondwanan fish and flora species.

A closer paleogeographical relation between the paleocontinents has been suggested to explain this curious combination.

Remains of the cartilaginous fish Antarctilamna sp., the Placoderms Asterolepis sp. and two species of Bothriolepis, the spiny shark ?Cheiracanthoides sp., the Porolepiform Holoptychius sp., and the Rhizodontid ?Strepsodus sp. have been uncovered from the Cuche Formation. Several other fossils are less well recognizable at the genus level, among others Actinopterygii, Sarcopterygii, and Osteolepiformes. The fish specimens were found in sediments possibly representing localized transgressive marine incursions into brackish lagoonal settings, in all cases associated with the presence of bivalves, ostracods and brachiopods.

The fossil fish assemblage of the Cuche Formation presents a curious mixture of Euramerican "Old Red Sandstone" (Catskills, Greenland, Scotland and the Baltic states) species (Asterolepis and Holoptychius), and Gondwanan taxa (Antarctilamna), suggesting the interchange of species between the paleogeographical regions, possibly at closer distance than is presented in most paleogeographical models. This hypothesis is further strengthened by the discovery of typical Euramerican flora, as Archaeopteris.

Asterolepis has been known only from Euramerican fossils, except for a specimen found in Iran. The fish of the Cuche Formation are quite different from Bolivian Devonian fossils, with the exception of Antarctilamna. The similar sediments of the Colpacucho Formation in Bolivia have not provided the species discovered in the Cuche Formation, probably because of the cooler climate of the Devonian Bolivian seas more to the south than the paleogeographical position of northern Colombia (already around 51°S) at that time.

Fossils assigned to Florestacanthus cf. morenoi, Colombiaspis rinconensis and Colombialepis villarroeli were later described from the Cuche Formation.

=== Eurypterids ===
In 2019, fragments of the eurypterid Pterygotus were retrieved from the formation. The find represents the first sea scorpion from Colombia and the fourth from South America. The specimen (SGC-MGJRG.2018.I.5), assigned with uncertainty to P. bolivianus due to similarities with its holotype, represents the first eurypterid of Colombia and the fourth of South America. The fossil was dated as Frasnian (Late Devonian), showing that Pterygotus did not become extinct during the Middle Devonian as previously thought.

== Outcrops ==
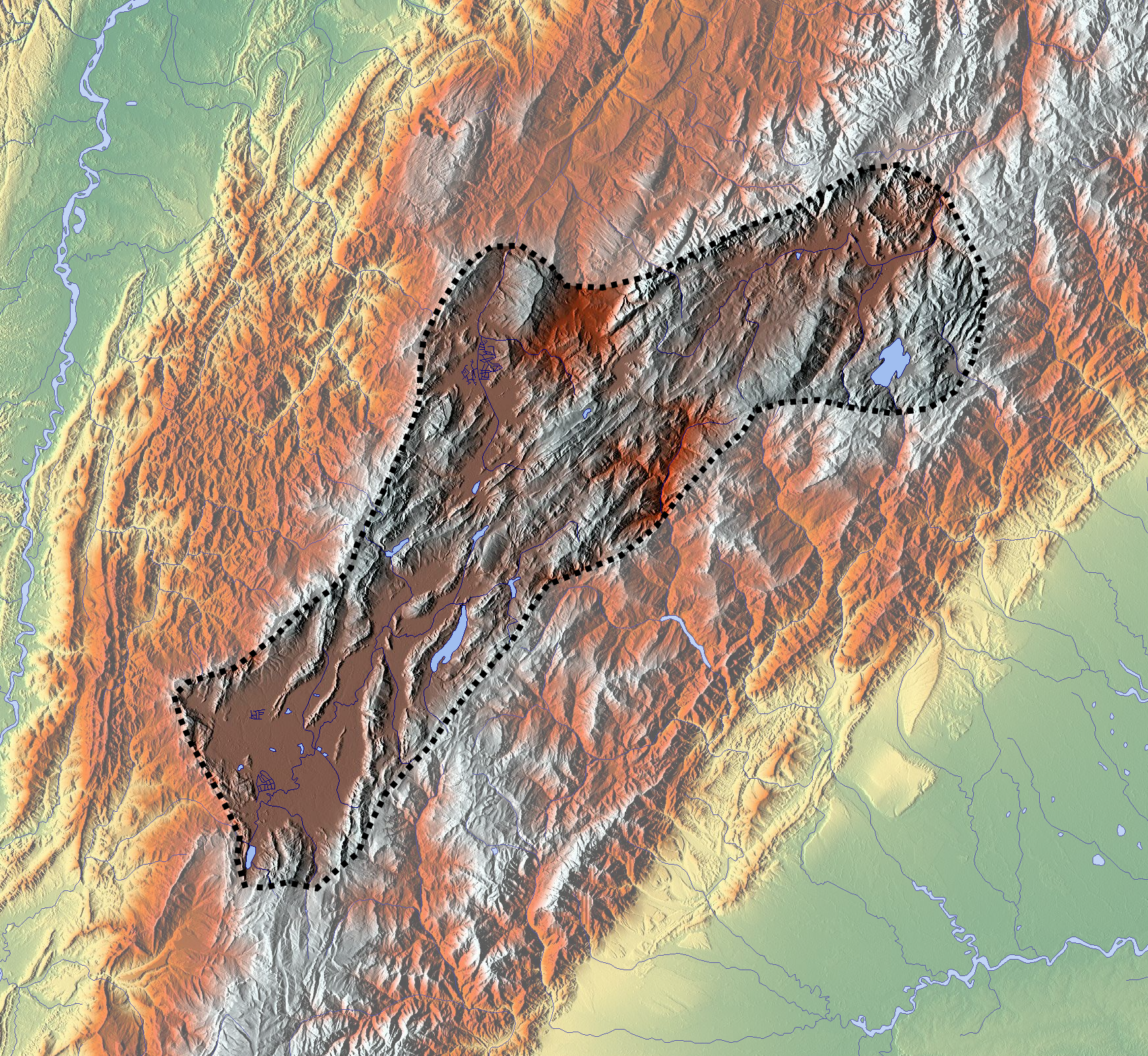
Type locality of the Cuche Formation in the north of the Altiplano Cundiboyacense

The Cuche Formation is found at the Floresta Massif around its type locality in Floresta, Boyacá, stretching across Floresta to the west close to Belén and Paz de Río, up to north of Tibasosa in the valley of the Chicamocha River.

== Regional correlations ==
Stratigraphy of the Llanos Basin and surrounding provinces
Ma	Age	Paleomap	Regional events	Catatumbo	Cordillera	proximal Llanos	distal Llanos	Putumayo	VSM	Environments	Maximum thickness	Petroleum geology	Notes
0.01	Holocene		Holocene volcanism Seismic activity	alluvium								Overburden	
1	Pleistocene		Pleistocene volcanism Andean orogeny 3 Glaciations	Guayabo	Soatá; Sabana	Necesidad	Guayabo	Gigante Neiva		Alluvial to fluvial (Guayabo)	550 m (1,800 ft) (Guayabo)	Overburden	
2.6	Pliocene		Pliocene volcanism Andean orogeny 3 GABI	Guayabo	Subachoque	Necesidad	Guayabo	Gigante Neiva		Alluvial to fluvial (Guayabo)	550 m (1,800 ft) (Guayabo)	Overburden	
5.3	Messinian		Andean orogeny 3 Foreland	Guayabo	Marichuela	Necesidad	Guayabo	Caimán	Honda	Alluvial to fluvial (Guayabo)	550 m (1,800 ft) (Guayabo)	Overburden	
13.5	Langhian		Regional flooding	León	hiatus	Caja	León	Caimán	Honda	Lacustrine (León)	400 m (1,300 ft) (León)	Seal	
16.2	Burdigalian		Miocene inundations Andean orogeny 2	C1	hiatus	Carbonera C1		Ospina	Honda	Proximal fluvio-deltaic (C1)	850 m (2,790 ft) (Carbonera)	Reservoir	
17.3	Burdigalian		Miocene inundations Andean orogeny 2	C2	hiatus	Carbonera C2		Ospina	Honda	Distal lacustrine-deltaic (C2)	850 m (2,790 ft) (Carbonera)	Seal	
19	Burdigalian		Miocene inundations Andean orogeny 2	C3	hiatus	Carbonera C3		Ospina	Honda	Proximal fluvio-deltaic (C3)	850 m (2,790 ft) (Carbonera)	Reservoir	
21	Early Miocene		Pebas wetlands	C4	hiatus	Carbonera C4		Ospina	Barzalosa	Distal fluvio-deltaic (C4)	850 m (2,790 ft) (Carbonera)	Seal	
23	Late Oligocene		Andean orogeny 1 Foredeep	C5	hiatus	Carbonera C5		Orito		Proximal fluvio-deltaic (C5)	850 m (2,790 ft) (Carbonera)	Reservoir	
25	Late Oligocene		Andean orogeny 1 Foredeep	C6	hiatus	Carbonera C6		Orito		Distal fluvio-lacustrine (C6)	850 m (2,790 ft) (Carbonera)	Seal	
28	Early Oligocene		Andean orogeny 1 Foredeep	C7	hiatus	C7		Pepino	Gualanday	Proximal deltaic-marine (C7)	850 m (2,790 ft) (Carbonera)	Reservoir	
32	Oligo-Eocene		Andean orogeny 1 Foredeep	C8	Usme	C8	onlap	Pepino	Gualanday	Marine-deltaic (C8)	850 m (2,790 ft) (Carbonera)	Seal; Source	
35	Late Eocene		Andean orogeny 1 Foredeep	Mirador	Usme	Mirador		Pepino	Gualanday	Coastal (Mirador)	240 m (790 ft) (Mirador)	Reservoir	
40	Middle Eocene		Andean orogeny 1 Foredeep	Mirador	Regadera	Mirador		Pepino	hiatus	Coastal (Mirador)	240 m (790 ft) (Mirador)	Reservoir	
45	Middle Eocene		Andean orogeny 1 Foredeep	Mirador	Regadera	Mirador		Pepino	hiatus	Coastal (Mirador)	240 m (790 ft) (Mirador)	Reservoir	
50	Early Eocene		Andean orogeny 1 Foredeep	Socha	Regadera	Los Cuervos		Pepino	hiatus	Deltaic (Los Cuervos)	260 m (850 ft) (Los Cuervos)	Seal; Source	
55	Late Paleocene		PETM; 2000 ppm CO_{2}	Los Cuervos	Bogotá	Los Cuervos		Pepino	Gualanday	Deltaic (Los Cuervos)	260 m (850 ft) (Los Cuervos)	Seal; Source	
60	Early Paleocene		SALMA	Barco	Guaduas	Barco		Rumiyaco	Gualanday	Fluvial (Barco)	225 m (738 ft) (Barco)	Reservoir	
65	Maastrichtian		KT extinction	Catatumbo	Guadalupe			Rumiyaco	Monserrate	Deltaic-fluvial (Guadalupe)	750 m (2,460 ft) (Guadalupe)	Reservoir	
72	Campanian		End of rifting	Colón-Mito Juan	Guadalupe			Rumiyaco	Monserrate	Deltaic-fluvial (Guadalupe)	750 m (2,460 ft) (Guadalupe)	Reservoir	
83	Santonian		End of rifting	Colón-Mito Juan	Guadalupe			Villeta/Güagüaquí		Deltaic-fluvial (Guadalupe)	750 m (2,460 ft) (Guadalupe)	Reservoir	
86	Coniacian		End of rifting	Colón-Mito Juan	Guadalupe			Villeta/Güagüaquí		Deltaic-fluvial (Guadalupe)	750 m (2,460 ft) (Guadalupe)	Reservoir	
89	Turonian		Cenomanian-Turonian anoxic event	La Luna	Chipaque	Gachetá	hiatus	Villeta/Güagüaquí		Restricted marine (all)	500 m (1,600 ft) (Gachetá)	Source	
93	Cenomanian		Rift 2	La Luna	Chipaque	Gachetá	hiatus	Villeta/Güagüaquí		Restricted marine (all)	500 m (1,600 ft) (Gachetá)	Source	
100	Albian		Rift 2	La Luna	Une	Une	hiatus	Caballos		Deltaic (Une)	500 m (1,600 ft) (Une)	Reservoir	
113	Aptian		Rift 2	Capacho	Fómeque	Une	hiatus	Motema	Yaví	Open marine (Fómeque)	800 m (2,600 ft) (Fómeque)	Source (Fóm)	
125	Barremian		High biodiversity	Aguardiente	Paja	Une	hiatus	Motema	Yaví	Shallow to open marine (Paja)	940 m (3,080 ft) (Paja)	Reservoir	
129	Hauterivian		Rift 1	Tibú- Mercedes	Las Juntas	hiatus	hiatus	Motema	Yaví	Deltaic (Las Juntas)	910 m (2,990 ft) (Las Juntas)	Reservoir (LJun)	
133	Valanginian		Rift 1	Río Negro	Cáqueza; Macanal; Rosablanca	hiatus	hiatus	Motema	Yaví	Restricted marine (Macanal)	2,935 m (9,629 ft) (Macanal)	Source (Mac)	
140	Berriasian		Rift 1	Girón	Cáqueza; Macanal; Rosablanca	hiatus	hiatus	Motema	Yaví	Restricted marine (Macanal)	2,935 m (9,629 ft) (Macanal)	Source (Mac)	
145	Tithonian		Break-up of Pangea	Jordán	Arcabuco	Buenavista Batá	hiatus	Saldaña		Alluvial, fluvial (Buenavista)	110 m (360 ft) (Buenavista)	"Jurassic"	
150	Early-Mid Jurassic		Passive margin 2	La Quinta	Montebel Noreán	hiatus	hiatus	Saldaña		Coastal tuff (La Quinta)	100 m (330 ft) (La Quinta)	"Jurassic"	
201	Late Triassic		Passive margin 2	Mucuchachi	Montebel Noreán	hiatus	hiatus	Payandé				"Jurassic"	
235	Early Triassic		Pangea		hiatus	hiatus	hiatus					"Paleozoic"	
250	Permian		Pangea		hiatus	hiatus	hiatus					"Paleozoic"	
300	Late Carboniferous		Famatinian orogeny		hiatus	hiatus	hiatus		Cerro Neiva ()			"Paleozoic"	
340	Early Carboniferous		Fossil fish Romer's gap		Cuche (355-385)	Farallones ()			Cerro Neiva ()	Deltaic, estuarine (Cuche)	900 m (3,000 ft) (Cuche)	"Paleozoic"	
360	Late Devonian		Passive margin 1	Río Cachirí (360-419)	Cuche (355-385)	Farallones ()			Ambicá ()	Alluvial-fluvial-reef (Farallones)	2,400 m (7,900 ft) (Farallones)	"Paleozoic"	
390	Early Devonian		High biodiversity	Floresta (387-400) El Tíbet					Ambicá ()	Shallow marine (Floresta)	600 m (2,000 ft) (Floresta)	"Paleozoic"	
410	Late Silurian		Silurian mystery	Floresta (387-400) El Tíbet								"Paleozoic"	
425	Early Silurian		Silurian mystery	hiatus								"Paleozoic"	
440	Late Ordovician		Rich fauna in Bolivia	San Pedro (450-490)		Duda ()						"Paleozoic"	
470	Early Ordovician		First fossils	San Pedro (450-490)	Busbanzá (>470±22) Chuscales Otengá	Guape ()		Río Nevado ()	Hígado () Agua Blanca; Venado (470-475)			"Paleozoic"	
488	Late Cambrian		Regional intrusions	Chicamocha (490-515)	Quetame ()	Ariarí ()		SJ del Guaviare (490-590)	San Isidro ()			"Paleozoic"	
515	Early Cambrian		Cambrian explosion		Quetame ()			SJ del Guaviare (490-590)	San Isidro ()			"Paleozoic"	
542	Ediacaran		Break-up of Rodinia		pre-Quetame		post-Parguaza	SJ del Guaviare (490-590)	El Barro ()	Yellow: allochthonous basement (Chibcha terrane); Green: autochthonous basement (Río Negro-Juruena Province)		Basement	
600	Neoproterozoic		Cariri Velhos orogeny	Bucaramanga (600-1400)	pre-Quetame		post-Parguaza	pre-Guaviare	El Barro ()	Yellow: allochthonous basement (Chibcha terrane); Green: autochthonous basement (Río Negro-Juruena Province)		Basement	
800	Neoproterozoic		Snowball Earth	Bucaramanga (600-1400)	pre-Quetame		post-Parguaza	pre-Guaviare	El Barro ()	Yellow: allochthonous basement (Chibcha terrane); Green: autochthonous basement (Río Negro-Juruena Province)		Basement	
1000	Mesoproterozoic		Sunsás orogeny	Bucaramanga (600-1400)	pre-Quetame	Ariarí (1000)	post-Parguaza	pre-Guaviare	La Urraca (1030-1100)	Yellow: allochthonous basement (Chibcha terrane); Green: autochthonous basement (Río Negro-Juruena Province)		Basement	
1300	Mesoproterozoic		Rondônia-Juruá orogeny	Bucaramanga (600-1400)	pre-Quetame	pre-Ariarí	Parguaza (1300-1400)	pre-Guaviare	Garzón (1180-1550)	Yellow: allochthonous basement (Chibcha terrane); Green: autochthonous basement (Río Negro-Juruena Province)		Basement	
1400	Mesoproterozoic		Rondônia-Juruá orogeny	pre-Bucaramanga	pre-Quetame	pre-Ariarí		pre-Guaviare	Garzón (1180-1550)	Yellow: allochthonous basement (Chibcha terrane); Green: autochthonous basement (Río Negro-Juruena Province)		Basement	
1600	Paleoproterozoic		Rondônia-Juruá orogeny	pre-Bucaramanga	pre-Quetame	pre-Ariarí	Maimachi (1500-1700)	pre-Guaviare	pre-Garzón	Yellow: allochthonous basement (Chibcha terrane); Green: autochthonous basement (Río Negro-Juruena Province)		Basement	
1800	Paleoproterozoic		Tapajós orogeny	pre-Bucaramanga	pre-Quetame	pre-Ariarí	Mitú (1800)	pre-Guaviare	pre-Garzón	Yellow: allochthonous basement (Chibcha terrane); Green: autochthonous basement (Río Negro-Juruena Province)		Basement	
1950	Paleoproterozoic		Transamazonic orogeny	pre-Bucaramanga	pre-Quetame	pre-Ariarí	pre-Mitú	pre-Guaviare	pre-Garzón	Yellow: allochthonous basement (Chibcha terrane); Green: autochthonous basement (Río Negro-Juruena Province)		Basement	
2200	Paleoproterozoic		Columbia	pre-Bucaramanga	pre-Quetame	pre-Ariarí	pre-Mitú	pre-Guaviare	pre-Garzón	Yellow: allochthonous basement (Chibcha terrane); Green: autochthonous basement (Río Negro-Juruena Province)		Basement	
2530	Archean		Carajas-Imataca orogeny	pre-Bucaramanga	pre-Quetame	pre-Ariarí	pre-Mitú	pre-Guaviare	pre-Garzón	Yellow: allochthonous basement (Chibcha terrane); Green: autochthonous basement (Río Negro-Juruena Province)		Basement	
3100	Archean		Kenorland	pre-Bucaramanga	pre-Quetame	pre-Ariarí	pre-Mitú	pre-Guaviare	pre-Garzón	Yellow: allochthonous basement (Chibcha terrane); Green: autochthonous basement (Río Negro-Juruena Province)		Basement	

Legend

- group
- important formation
- fossiliferous formation
- minor formation
- (age in Ma)
- proximal Llanos (Medina) (Note: based on Duarte et al. (2019), García González et al. (2009), and geological report of Villavicencio)
- distal Llanos (Saltarin 1A well) (Note: based on Duarte et al. (2019) and the hydrocarbon potential evaluation performed by the UIS and ANH in 2009)

== See also ==
Geology of the Eastern Hills
Geology of the Ocetá Páramo
Geology of the Altiplano Cundiboyacense
Bogotá, Cerrejón, Paja Formations, Honda Group
