= Gonzalo Correal Urrego =

Colombian anthropologist (born 1939)

dr. Gonzalo Correal Urrego
- Born: 23 October 1939 (age 86); Gachalá, Cundinamarca, Colombia
- Education: Instituto Colombiano de Antropología e Historia, 1964; Free University of Colombia, 1966
- Known for: Archaeology, anthropology of indigenous Colombian peoples, palaeontology
- Awards: Emeritus Professor at National University of Colombia, 1983; Honorary Professor, 1995
- Scientific career
- Fields: History, archaeology, anthropology
- Workplaces: Universidad Nacional de Colombia
- Thesis: La Leyenda del Dorado Laguna de Guatavita (1966)

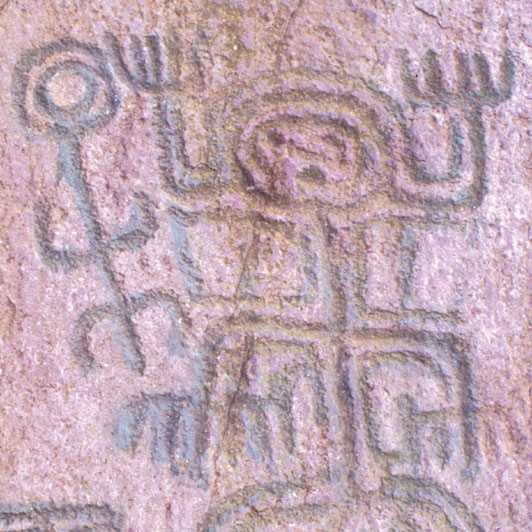
The site of El Abra, dated at 12,400 years BP, one of the oldest human evidences in South America

Gonzalo Correal Urrego (Gachalá, Colombia, 23 October 1939) is a Colombian anthropologist, palaeontologist and archaeologist. He has been contributing to the knowledge of prehistoric Colombia for over forty years and has published in Spanish and English. Correal Urrego is considered one of the most important anthropologists of Colombia. He has collaborated with many other anthropologists and archaeologists, among others Thomas van der Hammen and Ana María Groot.

== Biography ==
Gonzalo Correal Urrego was born in the village of Gachalá, in the eastern part of the Colombian department of Cundinamarca. Already as a child he did his first archaeological excavations in the Cuevas de los Alpes in his home village. He attended the Colegio de San Bartolomé La Merced, graduating in 1958. Correal went on to study anthropology and law and political sciences simultaneously at the Instituto Colombiano de Antropología e Historia and Universidad Libre respectively. In 1964 he obtained his degree in anthropology and in 1966 his PhD in law and political sciences.

As of 1966 he was a professor at the Universidad de Antioquia and between 1968 and 1971 at the Department of Anthropology of the Universidad Nacional de Colombia in Bogotá. From 1975 to 1995 Correal Urrego was professor in anthropology and archaeology at the Universidad Nacional.

Correal Urrego has investigated the preceramic period in Colombia (El Abra, Tequendama, Aguazuque, Tibitó, among others) and contributed to the knowledge of the Herrera Period, Muisca, Panches, Quimbaya and more. He also analysed the Pleistocene megafauna that still existed at the time of the first human populations in South America. Among those the mastodont of Zarzal.

Correal Urrego has been awarded various awards for his contributions in the fields of archaeology and anthropology, among others Primer Premio Nacional de Antropología y Arqueología in 1975, Profesor Emérito, Universidad Nacional de Colombia in 1983, Maestro Universitario, Universidad Nacional de Colombia in 1994, Profesor Honorario, Universidad Nacional de Colombia in 1995.

In 2007 Correal Urrego received recognition for his forty-year career at the Universidad Nacional with the Vida y Obra award. In 2015 the Universidad del Magdalena of Santa Marta awarded Correal the Medalla de Sierra Nevada de Santa Marta and in the same year the Instituto Colombiano de Antropología e Historia honoured Correal Urrego for his work.

== Works ==
This list is a selection.

=== Books ===
- 2012 - Introducción a la paleopatología precolombina
- 1990 - Aguazuque: evidencias de cazadores, recolectores y plantadores en la altiplanicie de la Cordillera Oriental
- 1983 - Investigación arqueológica en el municipio de Zipacón, Cundinamarca
- 1981 - Evidencias culturales y megafauna pleistocénica en Colombia
- 1979 - Investigaciones arqueológicas en abrigos rocosos de Nemocón y Sueva
- 1977 - Exploraciones arqueológicas en la costa Atlantica y valle del Magdalena: sitios preceramicos y tipologias liticas
- 1977 - Investigaciones arqueológicas en los abrigos rocosos del Tequendama: 12.000 Años de historia del hombre y su medio ambiente en la altiplanicie de Bogotá

=== Articles ===
- 2007 - Zipaquirá 400 años. Aspectos Arqueológicos y Etnohistóricos
- 2007 - Human Skeletal Remains from Sabana de Bogotá, Colombia. A case of Paleoamerican Morphology late Survival in South América - American Journal of Physical Anthropology
- 1994 - Evidence of mitochondrial DNA. Diversity in South American aboriginals
- 1992 - The Sedimentary Infill of the Sabana de Bogotá Basin and its Palaeoc1imatological Implications
- 1988 - Controlling the Water table During Resume Excavations an Example from Tibitó 1. A Preceramic kill site
- 1987 - Paleopathology in Preceramic Bones from Colombia: Examples of Syphilitic lesions from the Site of Aguazuque, Soacha
- 1978 - Pre-historical man on the Sabana de Bogotá. Data for and Ecological Prehistoric
- 1973 - Evidencias de Cirugía Craneana Prehistórica en Colombia
- 1972 - Preceramic Sequences in El Abra Rock Shelters, Colombia - Science
- 1971 - Hacia los orígenes y la antigüedad del hombre en Colombia: Comprobada científicamente su existencia hace más de 12.400 años
- 1966 - La Leyenda del Dorado Laguna de Guatavita

== See also ==
- List of Muisca scholars
- Muisca
- Aguazuque, Tequendama, Tibitó

== Notable works by Correal Urrego ==
- Correal Urrego, Gonzalo (2002), Evidencias Culturales Pleistocénicas y del Temprano Holoceno en la Cordillera Oriental de Colombia: Periodización Tentativa - Cultural evidences of the Pleistocene and Early Holocene in the Eastern Ranges of Colombia: tentative timing (PDF) (in Spanish), Ediciones ABYA-YALA, pp. 63–73, ISBN 9978-04-466-3
- Correal Urrego, Gonzalo (1990), Aguazuque: Evidence of hunter-gatherers and growers on the high plains of the Eastern Ranges (PDF) (in Spanish), Bogotá, Colombia: Banco de la República: Fundación de Investigaciones Arqueológicas Nacionales, pp. 1–316
- Correal Urrego, Gonzalo (1990), "Evidencias culturales durante el Pleistocene y Holoceno de Colombia - Cultural evidences during the Pleistocene and Holocene of Colombia" (PDF), Revista de Arqueología Americana (in Spanish), 1: 69–89
