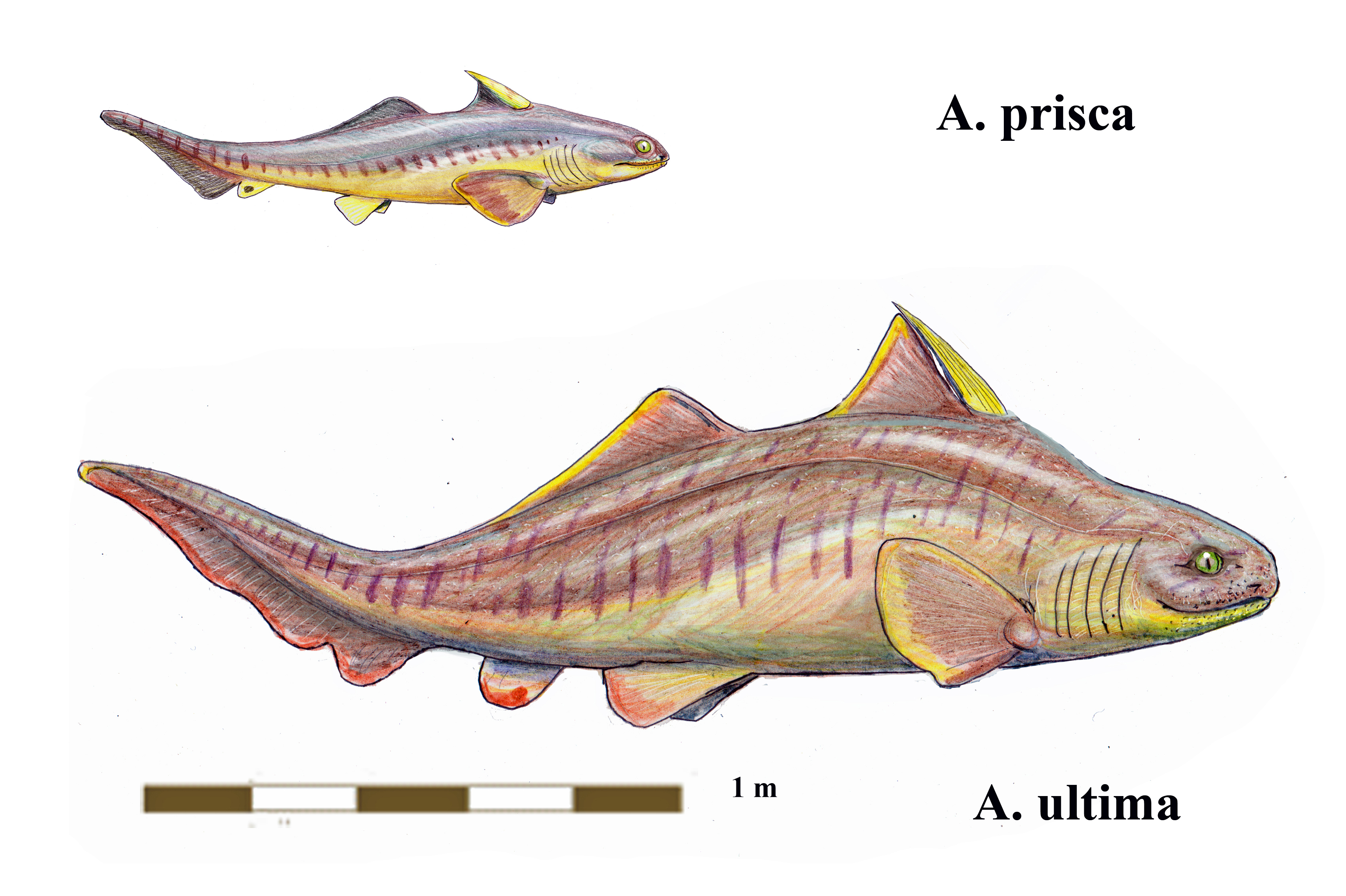
- Restorations of A. prisca from Middle Devonian of Antarctica and A. ultima from Late Devonian of South Africa

Scientific classification
- Kingdom: Animalia
- Phylum: Chordata
- Class: Chondrichthyes
- Subclass: Elasmobranchii
- Order: †Antarctilamniformes
- Family: †Antarctilamnidae
- Genus: †Antarctilamna; Young, 1982

Species
- †Antarctilamna prisca Young 1982; †Antarctilamna ultima Gess and Coates 2015

= Antarctilamna =

Antarctilamna Temporal range: Devonian

Extinct genus of Devonian shark

Antarctilamna is an extinct genus of Devonian cartilaginous fish originally exemplified by Antarctilamna prisca from South Eastern Australia and Antarctica. The latest occurring described species is Antarctilamna ultima from the Waterloo Farm lagerstätte in South Africa. Antarctilamna has robust ctenacanthid-like spines which lack a deep insertion area, and are borne in front of the first dorsal fin; in addition to distinctive diplodont teeth with small intermediate cusps. Antarctilamna-like spines, known from the Bunga Beds locality in Australia have been ascribed to A. prisca.

== Distribution ==
Fossils of Antarctilamna have been found in Antarctica and Australia. Similar dissociated spines from the Devonian are often referred to as Antarctilamna sp.(for example from Bolivia (Catavi Formation), Colombia (Cuche Formation, Boyacá), and Pont de Suert, Spain. Many of these tentative diagnoses may not be congeneric, as other early sharks bore similar spines – the early Devonian Doliodus, for example, bore similar looking spines on both the dorsal and paired fins.

== Species ==
=== Antarctilamna prisca ===
The description of Antarctilamna prisca includes material derived from both Antarctic and New South Wales localities, the prior comprising the holotype, a partial decayed carcass with dermal denticles, a fin spine and teeth preserved. Material from New South Wales comprises isolated spines. On this basis the authors proposed a tentative correlation between the lower part of the Aztec Siltstone of South Victoria and the Bunga Beds of the New South Wales south coast.

=== Antarctilamna ultima ===
Antarctilamna ultima is one of two shark-like species diagnosed from the Waterloo Farm lagerstätte in South Africa. It is described from an assemblage of elements including a dorsal fin spine, jaws and diplodont teeth derived from an individual that was approximately 1m long. A number of isolated spines, larger isolated teeth, and a partial skull are also presumed to belong to this species. A rough estimate assuming a constant relationship between tooth width, mandibular length and body length suggests that Antarctilamna ultima reached several metres in length. Antarctilamna ultima are known from dorsal fin spines, teeth, cartilaginous elements, skin impressions and a small whole-bodied impression. Antarctilamna ultima is the first recorded Devonian chondrichthyan known from a juvenile specimen, and the latter's juvenile status is supported not just by its extremely small size, but also by its very large head and branchial region, which together exceeded a quarter of its body length. Studies suggests that large sharks frequently entered the Waterloo Farm estuary from the sea when the mouth was open, in order to forage, but it is also possible that they gave birth within the estuarine lake which acted as a nursery area for these species.

== Affinities ==
Authors have either suggested that Antarctilamna is related to xenacanths, or that it is a basal chondrichthyan.

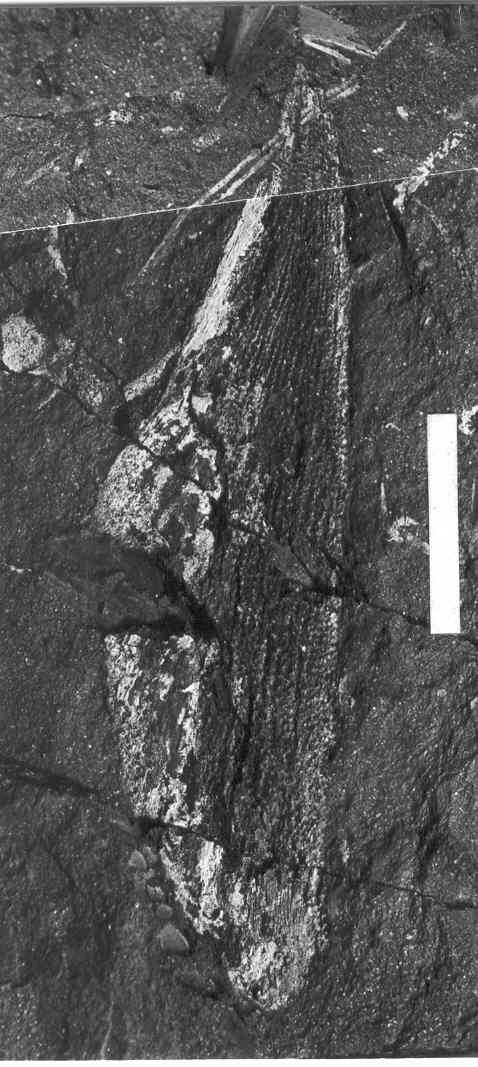
Antarctilamna ultima, first dorsal fin spine from the Waterloo Farm lagerstätte.
