= Fortuynia (mite) =

Scientific classification
- Kingdom: Animalia
- Phylum: Arthropoda
- Subphylum: Chelicerata
- Class: Arachnida
- Order: Sarcoptiformes
- Family: Fortuyniidae
- Genus: Fortuynia; Hammen, 1960

Genus of mites

Fortuynia is a genus of mite of the family Fortuyniidae. The genus was described in 1960 by Thomas van der Hammen.
