= Fortuyniidae =

Scientific classification
- Domain: Eukaryota
- Kingdom: Animalia
- Phylum: Arthropoda
- Subphylum: Chelicerata
- Class: Arachnida
- Order: Sarcoptiformes
- Family: Fortuyniidae

Family of mites

Fortuyniidae is a family of mites belonging to the order Sarcoptiformes.

Genera:

- Alismobates Luxton, 1992
- Circellobates Luxton, 1992
- Fortuynia Hammen, 1960
- Litoribates Pfingstl & Schatz, 2017
