= Fortuynia garcinii =

Scientific classification
- Kingdom: Plantae
- Clade: Tracheophytes
- Clade: Angiosperms
- Clade: Eudicots
- Clade: Rosids
- Order: Brassicales
- Family: Brassicaceae
- Genus: Fortuynia; Shuttlew. ex Boiss.
- Species: F. garcinii

Binomial name
- Fortuynia garcinii (Burm.f.) Shuttlew.

Synonyms
- Clypeola indica Poir.; Fortuynia aucheri Shuttlew.; Fortuynia aucheri var. bungei (Boiss.) Parsa; Fortuynia bungei Boiss.; Peltaria garcinii Burm.f.

Species of flowering plant

Fortuynia garcinii is a species of flowering plant in the family Brassicaceae. It is the sole species in genus Fortuynia. It is a subshrub native to Iran, Afghanistan, and western Pakistan, where it grows in deserts and dry shrublands.

The species was first described as Peltaria garcinii by Nicolaas Laurens Burman in 1768. In 1841 Robert J. Shuttleworth described and published the genus Fortuynia in Ann. Sci. Nat., Bot., séries 2, Vol.16 on page 379 in 1841. The genus is named after Mr. Fortuyne, an unknown person from present-day Jakarta, Indonesia. Shuttleworth placed the species in genus Fortuynia the following year.
