= Thomas van der Hammen =

Dutch palaeontologist, botanist and geologist (1924–2010)

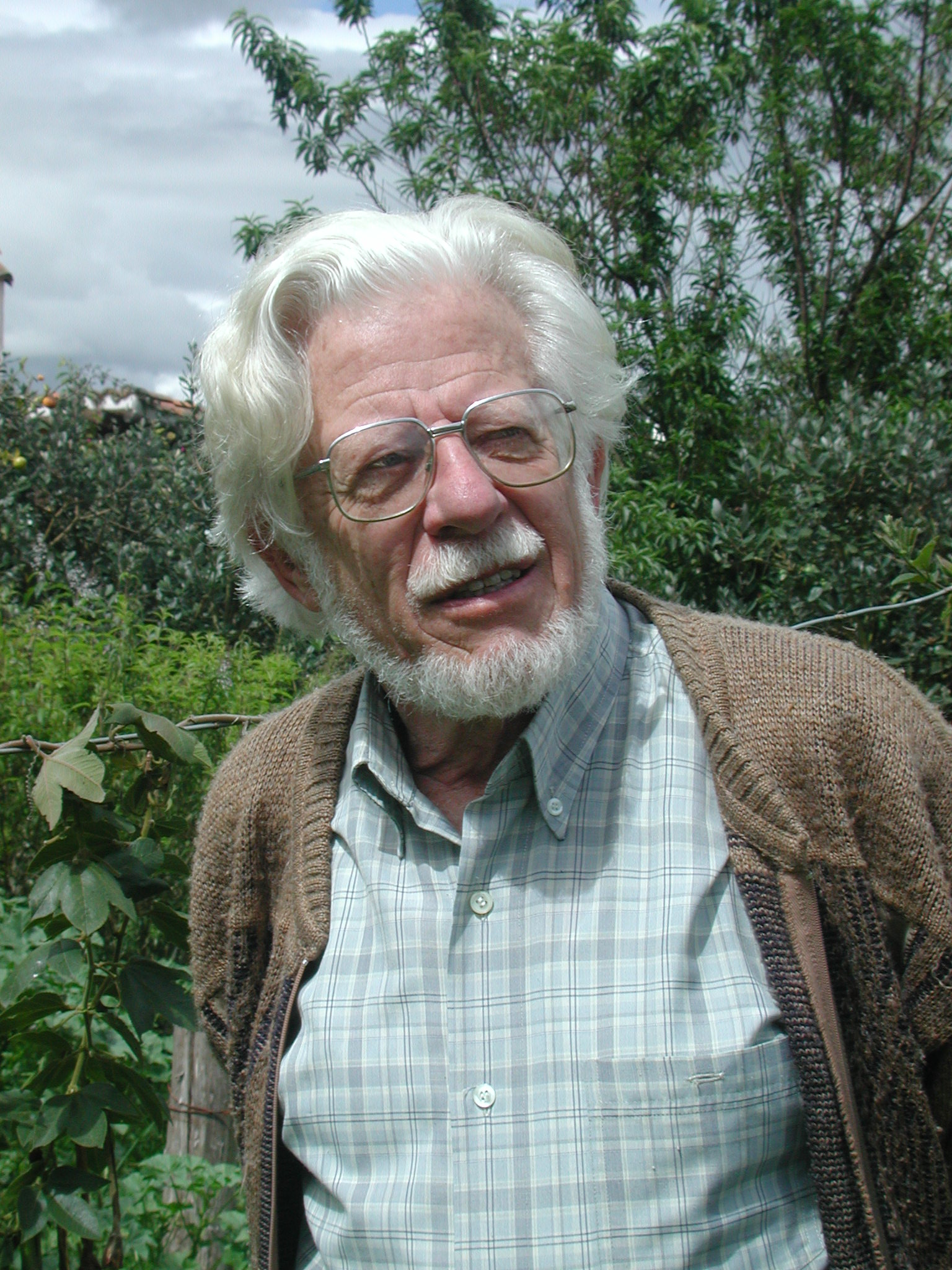
- Born: 27 September 1924; Schiedam, Netherlands
- Died: 12 March 2010 (aged 85); Chía, Cundinamarca, Colombia
- Education: Leiden University
- Known for: Geology, palaeontology
- Spouse: Anita Malo
- Children: Cornelis, María Clara
- Awards: Premio a la vida y obra, fondo para la protección del medio ambiente, 1995
- Scientific career
- Fields: Geology, palaeontology of Colombia
- Thesis: Late-glacial flora and periglacial phenomena in the Netherlands (1951)

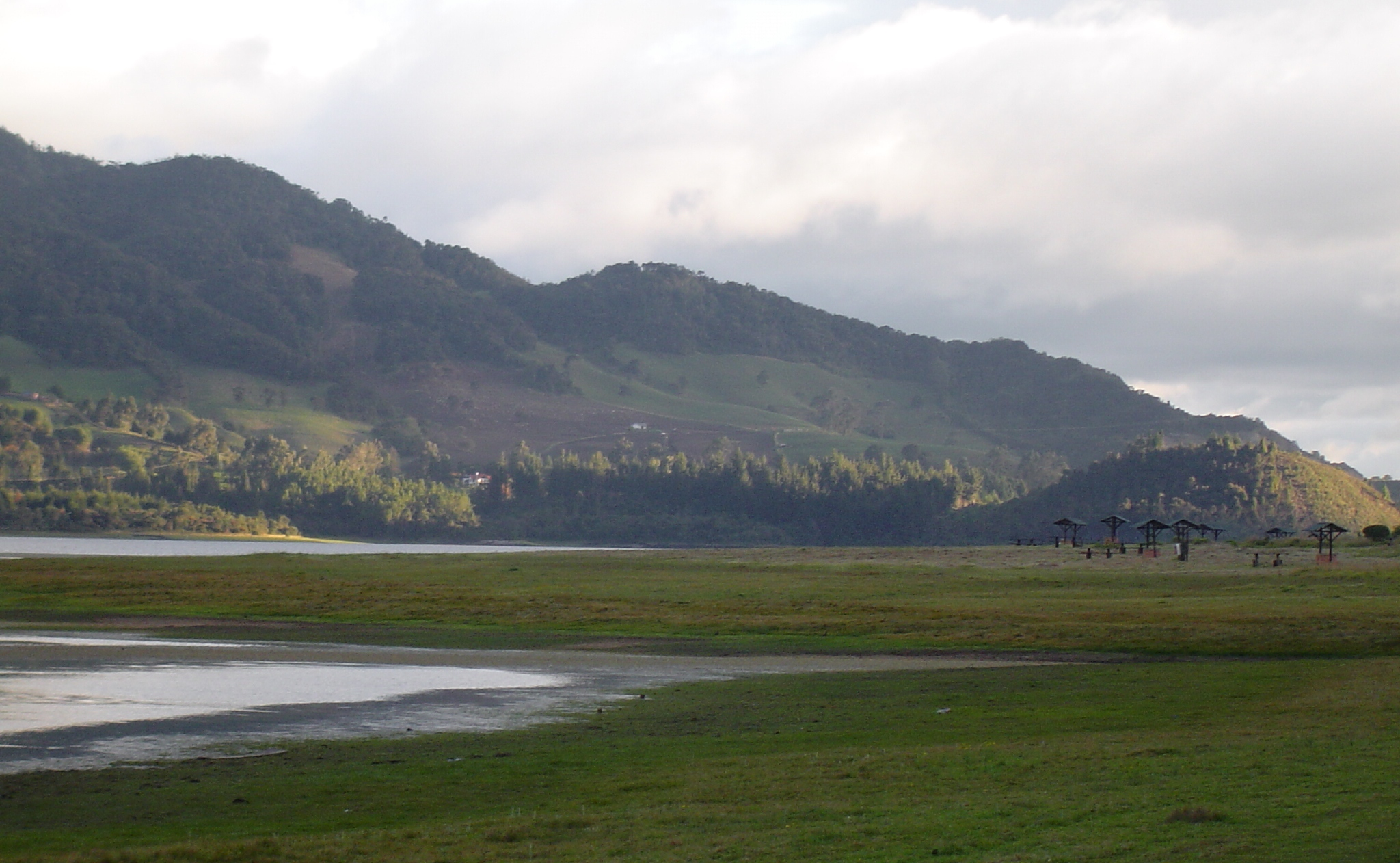
The Bogotá savanna, where Van der Hammen did a lot of his work

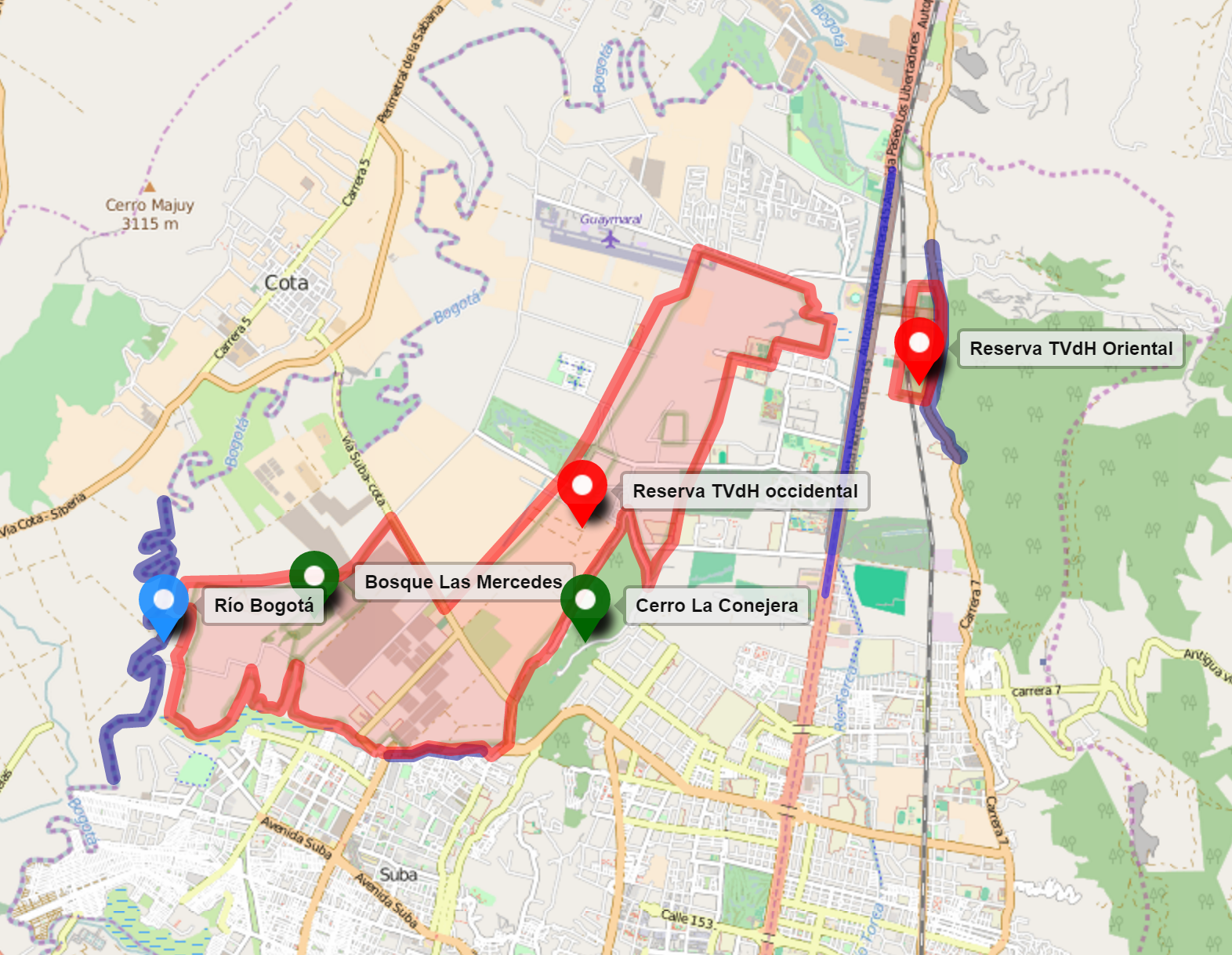
Map of the Thomas van der Hammen Reserve in the north of Bogotá

Thomas van der Hammen (Schiedam, Netherlands, 27 September 1924 - Chía, Colombia, 12 March 2010) was a Dutch palaeontologist, botanist and geologist. He had published more than 160 works in five languages.

== Biography ==
=== Personal life and education ===
Thomas van der Hammen was born in the city of Schiedam in South Holland, western The Netherlands. He studied botany and palaeontology at Leiden University from 1944 to 1949. He was a deeply religious man.

=== Career ===
After his studies and years of research at the University of Amsterdam, van der Hammen arrived in Bogotá in 1951.

Van der Hammen analysed the Bogotá savanna and concluded a great lake (Lake Humboldt) was present there around 60,000 years BP, covering present-day Bogotá, Soacha, Funza, Mosquera, Madrid, Cota, Chía and Cajicá. Van der Hammen has contributed greatly to the understanding of the geology of the Bogotá savanna and surrounding areas. He has worked with Gonzalo Correal Urrego towards an understanding of the prehistoric sites, as El Abra, Tequendama and Tibitó in central Colombia and has defined and described various geological formations, such as the Marichuela, Tunjuelo, and Subachoque Formations. His paleobotanical background proved valuable in dating the continental Cacho Formation.

In 2000, a natural reserve in the north of Bogotá bordering Chía and Cota, Thomas van der Hammen Natural Reserve, was named after the naturalist. The mayor of Bogotá, Enrique Peñalosa, who ran twice for the Green Party, allowed the construction of homes in the reserve, leading to protests by residents.

In 2003, van der Hammen granted a wide-ranging interview to Radio Netherlands about his work and his life.

== Works ==
This list is a selection.

=== Books ===
- 2008 - La Cordillera Oriental Colombiana Transecto Sumapaz - Estudios de Ecosistemas Tropandinos
- 2007 - Atlas de Páramos de Colombia
- 1986 - La Sierra Nevada de Santa Marta (Colombia) Transecto Buritaca-La Cumbre
- 1979 - Changes in life conditions on Earth during the past one million years
- 1953 - Late-glacial flora and periglacial phenomena in the Netherlands

=== Articles ===
- 2006 - La conservación de la biodiversidad: hacia una estructura ecológica de soporte de la nación colombiana
- 2001 - Diversidade biológica e cultural da Amazonia
- 1997 - El bosque de Condalia
- 1981 - Environmental changes in the Northern Andes and the extinction of Mastodon
- 1978 - Stratigraphy and environment of the Upper Quaternary of the El Abra corridor and rock shelters (Colombia)
- 1972 - Changes in vegetation and climate in the Amazon basin and surrounding areas during the Pleistocene
- 1966 - The Pliocene and Quaternary of the Sabana de Bogotá (The Tilatá and Sabana Formations)
- 1957 - Climatic periodicity and evolution of South American Maestichtian and Tertiary floras
- 1951 - Vegetatie en stratigrafie van het Laat-glaciaal en het Pleni-glaciaal
- 1949 - De Allerod-oscillatie in Nederland. Pollenanalytisch onderzoek van een laatglaciale meerafzetting in Drente

The standard author abbreviation Hammen is used to indicate this person as the author when citing a botanical name.

== See also ==
- Tequendama, Tibitó
- Gonzalo Correal Urrego, Bogotá savanna, El Abra, Thomas van der Hammen Natural Reserve

== Notable works by Van der Hammen ==
- Morales M., Otero J., Hammen Thomas van der., Torres A., Cadena-Vargas C., Pedraza C., Rodríguez N., Franco C., Betancourth J.C., Olaya E., Posada E. y Cárdenas L. 2007. Atlas de páramos de Colombia. Instituto de Investigación de Recursos Biológicos Alexander von Humboldt. Bogotá, D. C. 208 p. ISBN 978-958-8151-91-5
- Hammen, Thomas van der; Correal Urrego, Gonzalo (2003), "Supervivencia de mastodontes, megaterios y presencia del hombre en el Valle del Magdalena (Colombia) entre 6000 y 5000 A.P. - Survival of mastodonts, megatheriums and the presence of man in the Magdalena Valley (Colombia) between 6000 and 5000 years BP" (PDF), Rev. Acad. Colomb. Cienc. (in Spanish), 27: 159–164, ISSN 0370-3908
- Hammen, Thomas van der (2003), La conservación de la biodiversidad: hacia una estructura ecológica de soporte de la nación colombiana [The conservation of the biodiversity: towards an ecological structure supported by the Colombian nation] (PDF) (in Spanish), Universidad Nacional de Colombia, pp. 286–291
- Hammen, Thomas van der (1994), Stratigraphic Dating and Cultural Sequences of Pre-Hispanic Northern South America (PDF), The Getty Conservation Institute, pp. 381–393, ISBN 0-89236-249-9
- Hammen, Thomas van der; Cleef, Antoine M. (1983), "Datos para la Historia de la Flora Andina" [Data on the History of the Andean Flora] (PDF), Revista Chilena de Historia Natural (in Spanish), 56: 97–107
