= List of Muisca toponyms =

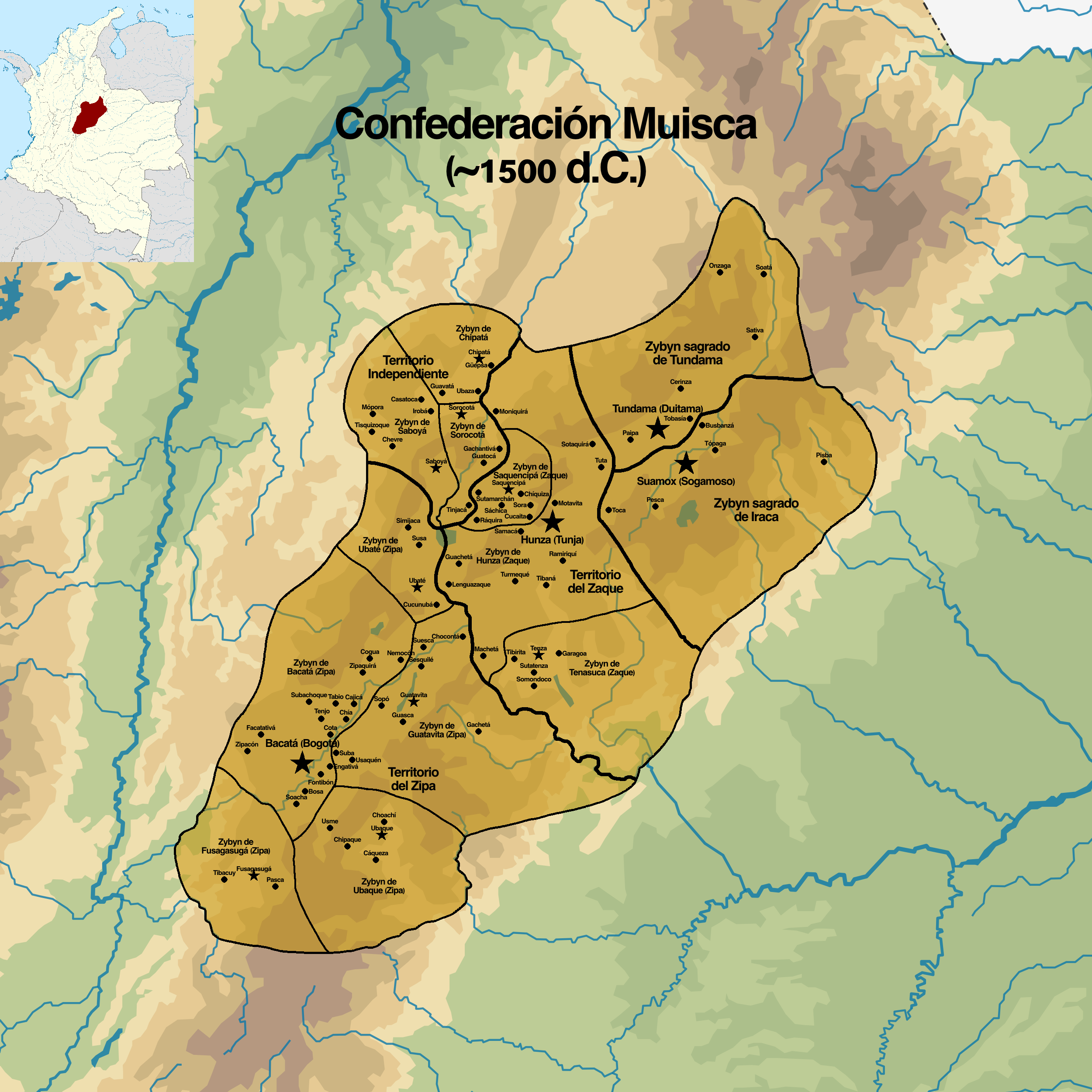
The Muisca Confederation

This list contains the toponyms (place names) in Muisca, the language of the Muisca who inhabited the Colombian Altiplano Cundiboyacense before the Spanish conquest of the Muisca in the 1530s. The name of the language of the Muisca is called Chibcha, Muisca or, in its own language, Muysccubun. Muisca means "man", "person" or "people".

Most names of the Muisca have been kept by the Spanish colonists, though some are slightly altered through time. A number of names refer to the farmfields (tá) or other geographical features of the region. The name of the department of Cundinamarca is an exception, it is inferred the name comes not from Chibcha, yet from Quechua, meaning condor's nest.

Chibcha language toponyms outside the Muisca Confederation territories, such as the Guane, Lache, U'wa or Sutagao and Spanish language toponyms within the Muisca Confederation are not included.

== Muisca toponyms ==
(Modern) name bold is capital	Department bold is capital	Ruler(s) bold is seat	Meaning(s) in Muysccubun bold is personal name	Notes	Map
Bogotá; Bogotá Formation; Bogotá River; Bogotá savanna Bacatá; Muequetá	Cundinamarca, Capital District	zipa	(Enclosure) outside the farm fields		
Tunja; Hunza	Boyacá	zaque	Proud lord		
Duitama; Tundama; Tundama Province	Boyacá	Tundama	Named after cacique Tundama		
Sogamoso; Suamox; Sugamuxi Province	Boyacá	iraca	Dwelling of the Sun (Sué)		
Arcabuco; Arcabuco Formation	Boyacá	cacique	Place of the intricate scrublands Place enclosed by the hills		
Betéitiva	Boyacá	cacique	Chief of the mouth Named after cacique Betacín		
Boavita	Boyacá	cacique	Point on the hill worshipping the Sun; Gate of the Sun		
Boyacá; Boyacá Department	Boyacá	zaque	Region of the blankets Enclosure of the cacique		
Busbanzá	Boyacá	iraca	Named after cacique Boazá		
Cerinza	Boyacá	Tundama	My throat Named after cacique Cerinza		
Chinavita	Boyacá	zaque	Our point or illuminated hill top		
Chiquinquirá; Chiquinquirá Sandstone; Chiquinquirá Valley	Boyacá	cacique	Place of swamps covered with fog Also: Holy people, because of the Fúquene Lake ceremonies		
Chíquiza	Boyacá	zaque	Only or alone, Chiqui means priest Hairy field		
Chitagoto part of Paz de Río	Boyacá	Tundama	From cacique Chitagoto		
Chitaraque	Boyacá	zaque	Our vigorous farmfields from before		
Chivatá	Boyacá	zaque	Our outside farmfields		
Chivor; Chivor Mine	Boyacá	cacique	Our farmfields - our mother Green and rich land		
Ciénega	Boyacá	zaque	Place of water		
Cómbita	Boyacá	cacique	Force of the summit Hand of the jaguar and wheel of life		
Covarachía	Boyacá	cacique	Land of the Sun and the Moon; Cave of the Moon		
Cucaita	Boyacá	zaque	Seminary enclosure Shade of the farming fields		
Cuítiva	Boyacá	iraca	Similarity to the chief		
Firavitoba	Boyacá	iraca	Air of clouds		
Gachantivá	Boyacá	zaque	Chief of the Gacha		
Gámeza	Boyacá	iraca	Serf of the Sun		
Garagoa	Boyacá	zaque	Behind the hill On the other side of the hill		
Guateque; Guatoc	Boyacá	cacique	Stream of the ravine Lord of the winds		
Guayatá	Boyacá	cacique	Domain of the female cacique From Guaya (creek in Tenza) and "tá" (farmfields or land over there)		
Iza; Iza—Paipa volcanic complex	Boyacá	iraca	Place of healing		
Lengupá Province; Lengupá River	Boyacá	zaque	"Len": site; "Gua": of the river; "Paba": father or chief		
Macanal; Macanal Formation	Boyacá	zaque	From: Macana: palm tree or garrote		
Mongua	Boyacá	iraca	Bath on the hill Sunrise		
Moniquirá; Moniquirá River	Boyacá	cacique	Place of bath		
Motavita	Boyacá	zaque	Washing place to prepare for growing crops		
Nobsa	Boyacá	Tundama	Decent bath of today		
Oicatá	Boyacá	zaque	Domain of the priests Hailstoned farmlands		
Pachavita	Boyacá	zaque	Peak of the man Proud chief		
Paipa; Iza—Paipa volcanic complex	Boyacá	Tundama	Named after the cacique of the Paipa people		
Paya	Boyacá	cacique	People of hope		
Pesca	Boyacá	iraca	Strong enclosure Domain of the fortress		
Pisba; PNN Pisba	Boyacá	cacique	Honourable domain from before		
Ramiriquí; Ramaraquí	Boyacá	zaque	White earth Ca-Mi-Quiqui		
Ráquira	Boyacá	cacique	Village of the pans		
Saboyá	Boyacá	cacique	Taste for the blankets Named after cacique Saboyá		
Sáchica	Boyacá	zaque	our present domain fortress or mansion of the sovereign		
San Miguel de Sema	Boyacá	zaque	Named after the Sema tribe, part of the Muisca		
Sativanorte	Boyacá	Tundama	Named after the cacique Sátiva		
Sativasur	Boyacá	Tundama	Named after the cacique Sátiva		
Siachoque	Boyacá	zaque	Land of the vigorous taste Place of good smells and strong and vigorous cultures		
Soatá; Soatá Formation	Boyacá	Tundama	Farmfields of the Sun		
Socotá; Socotá Formation	Boyacá	iraca Tundama	Good harvest Land of the Sun and farmfields		
Somondoco	Boyacá	zaque	So = stone, Mon = bath, Co = support Named after cacique Somendoco or Sumindoco		
Sora	Boyacá	zaque	Devil worshipper		
Soracá	Boyacá	zaque	Ruling mansion of the sovereign		
Sotaquirá	Boyacá	zaque	Town of the sovereign		
Susacón	Boyacá	Tundama	Ally of the cacique Susa		
Sutamarchán	Boyacá	zaque	Merchant of the sovereign Suta; Marchán refers to 18th century encomendero Pedro Merchan de Velasco		
Sutatenza	Boyacá	zaque	Cloud behind the mouth Descending to the house of the cacique		
Tenza; Tenza Valley; Tanazuca	Boyacá	cacique	Behind the mouth Going down at night		
Tibaná	Boyacá	zaque	Named after Tibanaes "Tiba" means chief		
Tibasosa; Tibasosa Formation	Boyacá	Tundama iraca	Chief of the domain		
Tinjacá	Boyacá	zaque	Enclosure of the powerful lord		
Tipacoque	Boyacá	zaque	Name of the hacienda of the Augustines; Dependency of the zaque		
Toca	Boyacá	iraca	Domain of the river		
Togüí	Boyacá	zaque	River of the wife or house of the dog		
Tópaga	Boyacá	cacique	Behind father river		
Tota; Lake Tota	Boyacá	iraca	Farmfields of the river		
Turmequé	Boyacá	zaque	Vigorous chief		
Tuta	Boyacá	zaque	Borrowed farmlands or Property of the Sun; Named after the Tuta tribe		
Tutazá	Boyacá	cacique	Named after cacique Tutazúa; son of the Sun		
Úmbita	Boyacá	cacique	Your point, your summit, summit of the farmlands		
Viracachá	Boyacá	zaque	Air of the lake or lord of the enclosure of the wind		
Zetaquira	Boyacá	zaque	Land of the snake or City of the snake		
Bojacá; Bojacá River	Cundinamarca	zipa	Purple enclosure		
Cajicá	Cundinamarca	zipa	From ca and jica; "stone fortress" From the cacique Cajic		
Cáqueza; Cáqueza Group	Cundinamarca	zipa	Region or enclosure without forest		
Chía; Chía Formation	Cundinamarca	zipa	Named after Chía, Moon goddess		
Chipaque; Chipaque Formation	Cundinamarca	cacique	Derived from Chipapabacue; Forest of our ancestors		
Choachí	Cundinamarca	zipa	Derived from Chi-gua-chí; our mountain of the Moon		
Chocontá	Cundinamarca	zipa	Farmlands of the good ally		
Cogua	Cundinamarca	zipa	Support of the hill		
Cota	Cundinamarca	zipa	From personal name Gota or cota; "curl"		
Cucunubá	Cundinamarca	zipa	Similarity to a face		
Facatativá	Cundinamarca	zipa	Strong enclosure at the end of the plains		
Fómeque; Fómeque Formation	Cundinamarca	zipa	Your forest of the foxes		
Funza; Funza River	Cundinamarca	zipa	Powerful lord		
Fúquene; Lake Fúquene	Cundinamarca	zipa zaque	From fú and quyny; bed of the fox Named after the god Fu; bed of Fu		
Gachancipá	Cundinamarca	zipa	Pottery of the zipa		
Gachalá	Cundinamarca	cacique	Clay vessel or defeat of the night		
Gachetá; Gachetá Formation	Cundinamarca	cacique	Behind our farmfields		
Gama	Cundinamarca	cacique	Our back		
Guachetá	Cundinamarca	cacique	Farmlands of the hill		
Guasca	Cundinamarca	zipa	From guâ and shucâ; skirt of the mountain range		
Guatavita; Lake Guatavita	Cundinamarca	cacique	End of the farmlands		
Lenguazaque	Cundinamarca	zaque	End of the reign of the zaque		
Machetá	Cundinamarca	zaque	Your honourable farmfields		
Manta	Cundinamarca	cacique	Your farmfields		
Nemocón	Cundinamarca	zipa	From Enemocón; sadness of the warrior Named after Nemequene		
Pacho; Guataque or Gotaque	Cundinamarca	zipa	Good father "Gua" = mountain, "tha"; strong and "que"; elevated; strong elevated mountain		
Pasca	Cundinamarca	zipa	Father's enclosure		
Quetame; Quetame Group	Cundinamarca	cacique	Our farmfields of the mountain		
Sesquilé	Cundinamarca	zipa	Hot water		
Sibaté	Cundinamarca	zipa	Leak of the lake		
Simijaca; Simijaca Formation	Cundinamarca	zaque (<1490) zipa (1490–1537)	Blue circle or nose of the white owl		
Soacha; Soacha Province; Soacha River	Cundinamarca	zipa	Súa; Sun god Sué and chá; Man of the Sun		
Sopó	Cundinamarca	zipa	Rock or strong hill		
Subachoque; Subachoque River; Subachoque Formation	Cundinamarca	zipa	Work of the Sun; Farmfields of the front		
Suesca; Lake Suesca	Cundinamarca	zipa	Rock of the birds or Tail of the macaw		
Susa	Cundinamarca	zaque (<1490) zipa (1490–1537)	White reed or soft reed		
Sutatausa	Cundinamarca	zipa	Small tribute		
Tabio	Cundinamarca	zipa	Mouth [of the river]		
Tausa	Cundinamarca	zipa	Tribute		
Tena; Zuca	Cundinamarca	zipa	Place of rest for the zipa		
Tenjo	Cundinamarca	zipa	In the mouth		
Tequendama; Tequendama Falls; Tequendama Province	Cundinamarca	zipa	He who precipitates downward		
Tibacuy	Cundinamarca	zipa Panche	Official chief		
Tibiritá	Cundinamarca	zaque			
Tocancipá	Cundinamarca	zipa	Valley of the joys of the zipa		
Ubalá	Cundinamarca	cacique	Place on the hillside or At the foot of the hillside		
Ubaque	Cundinamarca	cacique	From Ybaque; blooding Eucalyptus tree or from Ebaque		
Ubaté; Ubaté Province; Ubaté River; Ubaté Valley	Cundinamarca	zaque (<1490) zipa (1490–1537)	Sower of the mouth or blooded land		
Une; Une Formation	Cundinamarca	cacique	Drop it or mud		
Zipacón	Cundinamarca	zipa	Crying of the zipa		
Zipaquirá	Cundinamarca	zipa	City of our father		
Charalá	Santander	cacique	Named after the Guane cacique Chalala		
Chipatá	Santander	cacique	"chi" = our, "pa" = father, "tá" = farmland Named after cacique Chipatá		
Onzaga	Santander	Tundama	From cacique Hunzaá		
Bosa	Cundinamarca	zipa	Enclosure of the one who guards and defends the cornfields		
Engativá	Cundinamarca	zipa	From Ingativá; Cacique of the land of the Sun; Engue-tivá; captain of the delicious [people]		
Fontibón	Cundinamarca	zipa	Powerful chief		
Suba; Suba Hills	Cundinamarca	zipa	From "sua"; Sun and "sie"; water From "uba"; fruit or flower and "sua"; Sun; Flower of the Sun		
Teusaquillo	Cundinamarca	zipa	From Teusacá; borrowed enclosure		
Tunjuelito; Tunjuelo Formation; Tunjuelo River	Cundinamarca	zipa	Diminutive form of tunjo; anthropomorph made of gold		
Usaquén	Cundinamarca	zipa	From cacique Usaque; Usaque means "under the pole"		
Usme; Usme Fault; Usme Formation	Cundinamarca	zipa	Nest of love		
El Chicó	Cundinamarca	zipa	Chicó comes from chicú; "our ally"		
Techo; Techo wetland	Cundinamarca	zipa	From cacique Techitina		
Chingaza	Cundinamarca	zipa Guayupe	Middle of the width		
Siecha Lakes	Cundinamarca	zipa	House of the Lord		
Tibabuyes	Cundinamarca	zipa	Land of the farmers		
Maiporé	Cundinamarca	zipa	Welcome		

== See also ==
- List of flora and fauna named after the Muisca
- Muisca Confederation
- Muysccubun
- List of placenames of indigenous origin in the Americas
  - List of Mapudungun placenames
