= Susacón =

Coordinates: 6°14′N 72°42′W

- Municipality and town
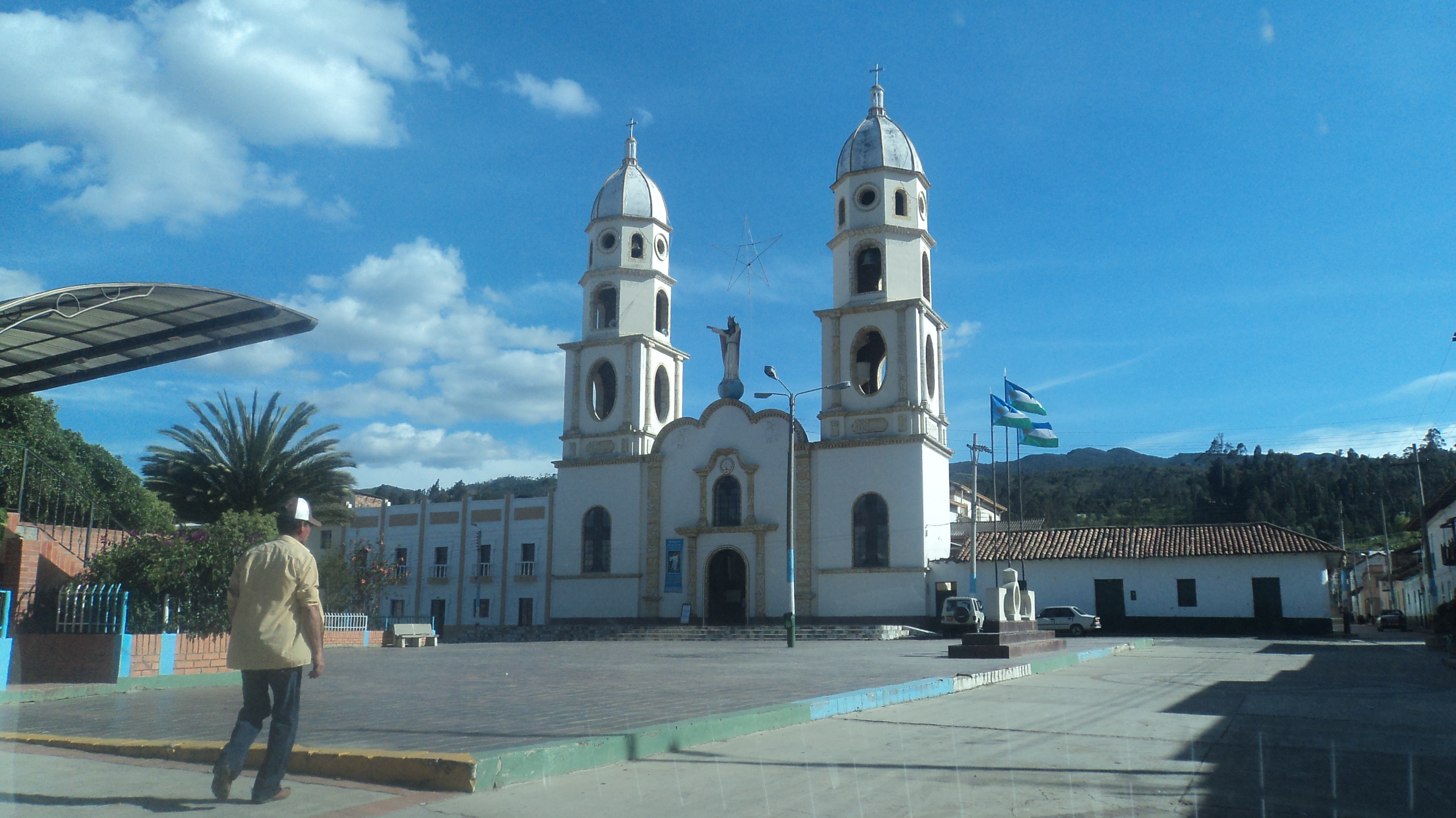
- Church of Susacón

- Flag Coat of arms

- Location of the municipality and town of Susacón in the Boyacá Department of Colombia
- Country: Colombia
- Department: Boyacá Department
- Province: Northern Boyacá Province
- Founded: 18 December 1809
- Founder: Nicolás Ramírez, Domingo de la Parra and Vicente Badilla

Government
  - Mayor: Silvio Alberto Rincón Ortega (2020-2023)

Area
  - Municipality and town: 191 km^{2} (74 sq mi)
  - Urban: 0.42 km^{2} (0.16 sq mi)
- Elevation: 2,480 m (8,140 ft)

Population (2015)
  - Municipality and town: 3,095
  - Density: 16.2/km^{2} (42.0/sq mi)
  - Urban: 966
- Time zone: UTC-5 (Colombia Standard Time)
- Website: Official website

Susacón is a town and municipality in the Colombian Department of Boyacá, part of the subregion of the Northern Boyacá Province. Susacón borders to the north Soatá, in the east Boavita, La Uvita and Jericó, in the south Sativanorte and in the west the Santander municipality of Onzaga.

== History ==
When the Spanish conquistadors led by Gonzalo Jiménez de Quesada entered the Altiplano Cundiboyacense, the central highlands of the Colombian Andes, they found there the Muisca Confederation, the former country, home of the Muisca.

Susacón was ruled by a cacique who was loyal to the cacique of Soatá. The cacique of Susacón took part in the bloody Battle of Bonza against the Spanish troops of De Quesada.

Although the Spanish missionaries already arrived in 1556, the village was officially founded on December 18, 1809.

Susacón means in Chibcha: "ally of the cacique Susa".

== Economy ==
Main economical activities of Susacón are agriculture (potatoes, maize, barley, sugar cane, wheat and bananas), livestock farming, fishing and crafts.
