= Covarachía =

Coordinates: 6°30′N 72°45′W

- Municipality and town
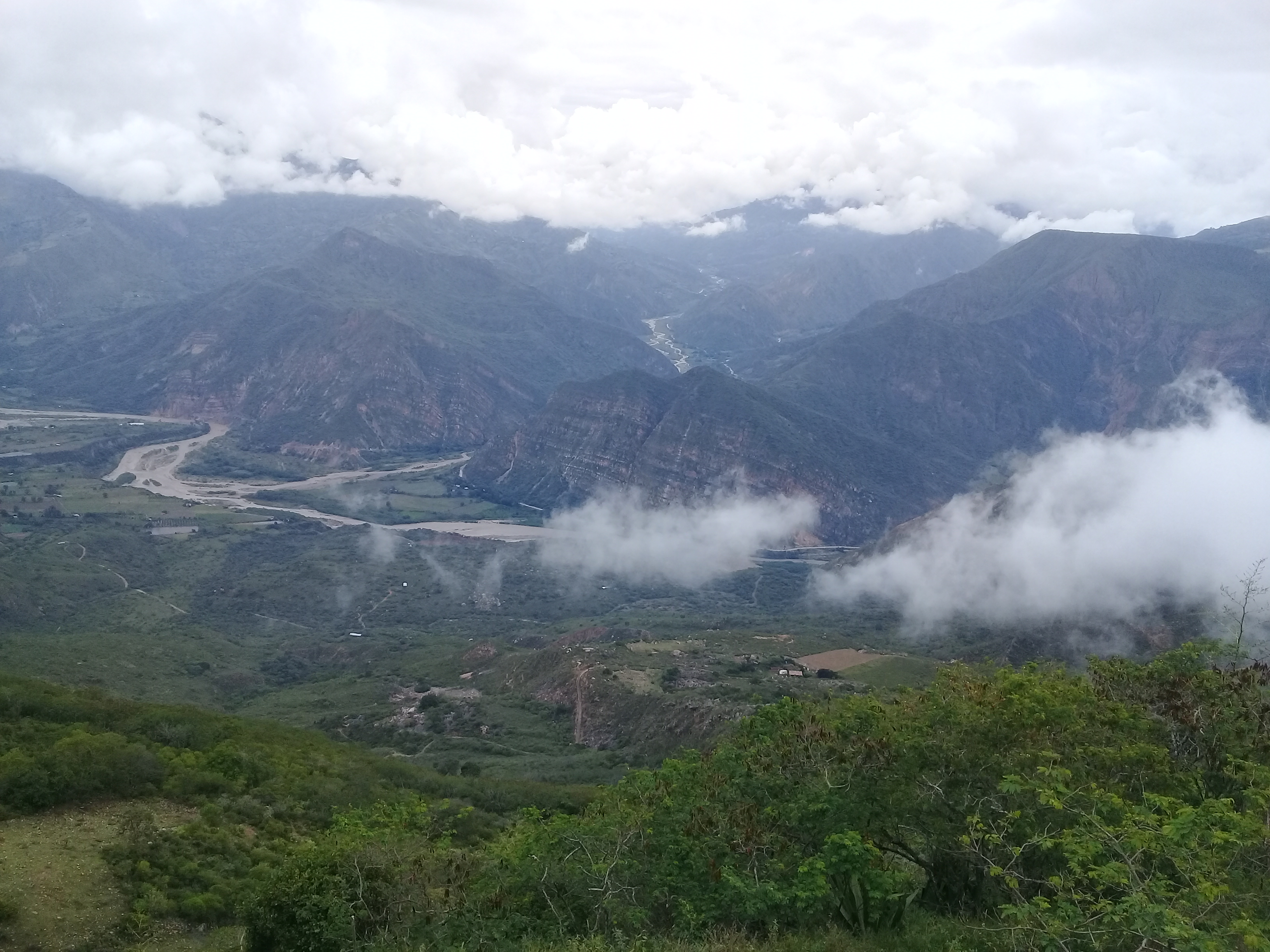

- Flag

- Location of the municipality and town of Covarachía in the Boyacá Department of Colombia
- Country: Colombia
- Department: Boyacá Department
- Province: Northern Boyacá Province
- Founded: 10 February 1823
- Founder: Juan Zámano & Felipe Pérez

Government
  - Mayor: Yolanda Salazar Sierra Partido de la U (2024-2027)

Area
  - Municipality and town: 103 km^{2} (40 sq mi)
- Elevation: 2,320 m (7,610 ft)

Population (2015)
  - Municipality and town: 2,861
  - Density: 27.8/km^{2} (71.9/sq mi)
  - Urban: 516
- Time zone: UTC-5 (Colombia Standard Time)
- Website: Official website

Covarachía is a town and municipality in the Northern Boyacá Province, part of the Colombian Department of Boyacá. The urban centre is located at 208 kilometres (129 mi) from the department capital Tunja at an altitude of 2,320 metres (7,610 ft) in the Eastern Ranges of the Colombian Andes. The municipality borders San José de Miranda and Capitanejo (both Santander) in the north, Tipacoque in the south, Capitanejo in the east and in the west the municipalities Onzaga and San Joaquín (Santander).

== Etymology ==
The name Covarachía is a combination of Spanish and Chibcha; "cave of the Moon", with Chía referring to the Moon goddess Chía.

== History ==
Covarachía was inhabited by indigenous people during the Herrera Period, and later, in the northeasternmost part of the Muisca Confederation, ruled by a cacique. Covarachía is bordered by the Chicamocha River and the territories to the east of the town were inhabited by the Lache people. The Muisca were the people who lived on the Altiplano Cundiboyacense before the Spanish conquest of the Muisca in the 1530s.

Modern Covarachía, called Ricaurte between 1858 and 1869, was founded on February 10, 1823, by Juan Zámano and Felipe Pérez.

== Economy ==
Main economical activities of Covarachía are agriculture and livestock farming. Important agricultural products are tobacco, fique, pineapples, yuca, maize, peas, sugarcane, tomatoes and melons.
