= Northern Boyacá Province =

Northern Boyacá Province Provincia de Boyacá Norte
- Province
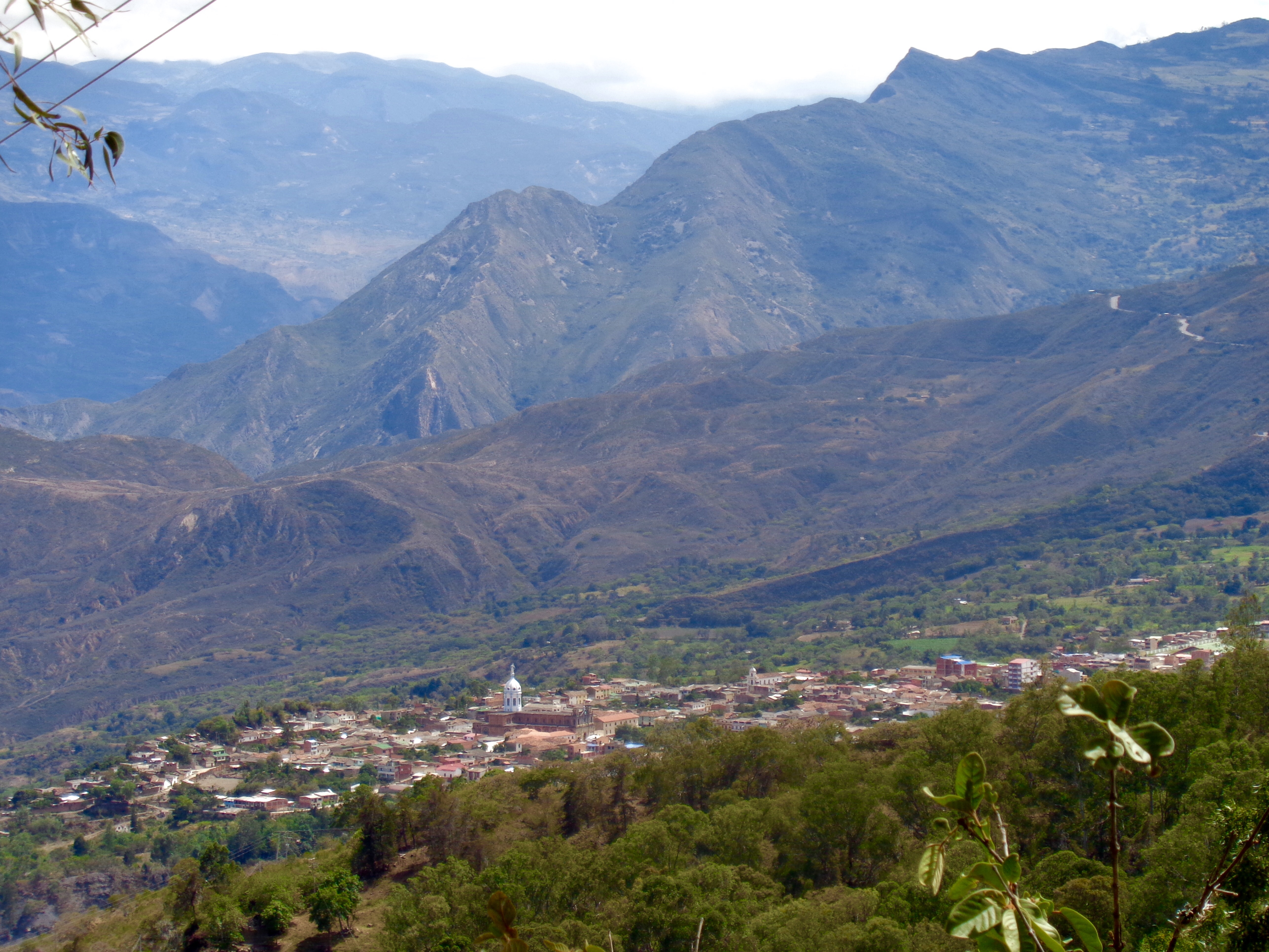
- View of Soatá

- Location of Northern Boyacá Province in Colombia
- Coordinates: 6°20′00″N 72°40′00″W
- Country: Colombia
- Department: Boyacá
- Capital: Soatá
- Municipalities: 9

Area
  - Total: 1,224 km^{2} (473 sq mi)
- Time zone: UTC−5 (COT)
- Indigenous groups: Muisca

The Northern Boyacá Province is a province of the Colombian Department of Boyacá. The province is formed by 9 municipalities.

== Municipalities ==
Boavita • Covarachía • La Uvita • San Mateo • Sativanorte • Sativasur • Soatá • Susacón • Tipacoque
