= San Mateo, Boyacá =

San Mateo
- Municipality and town
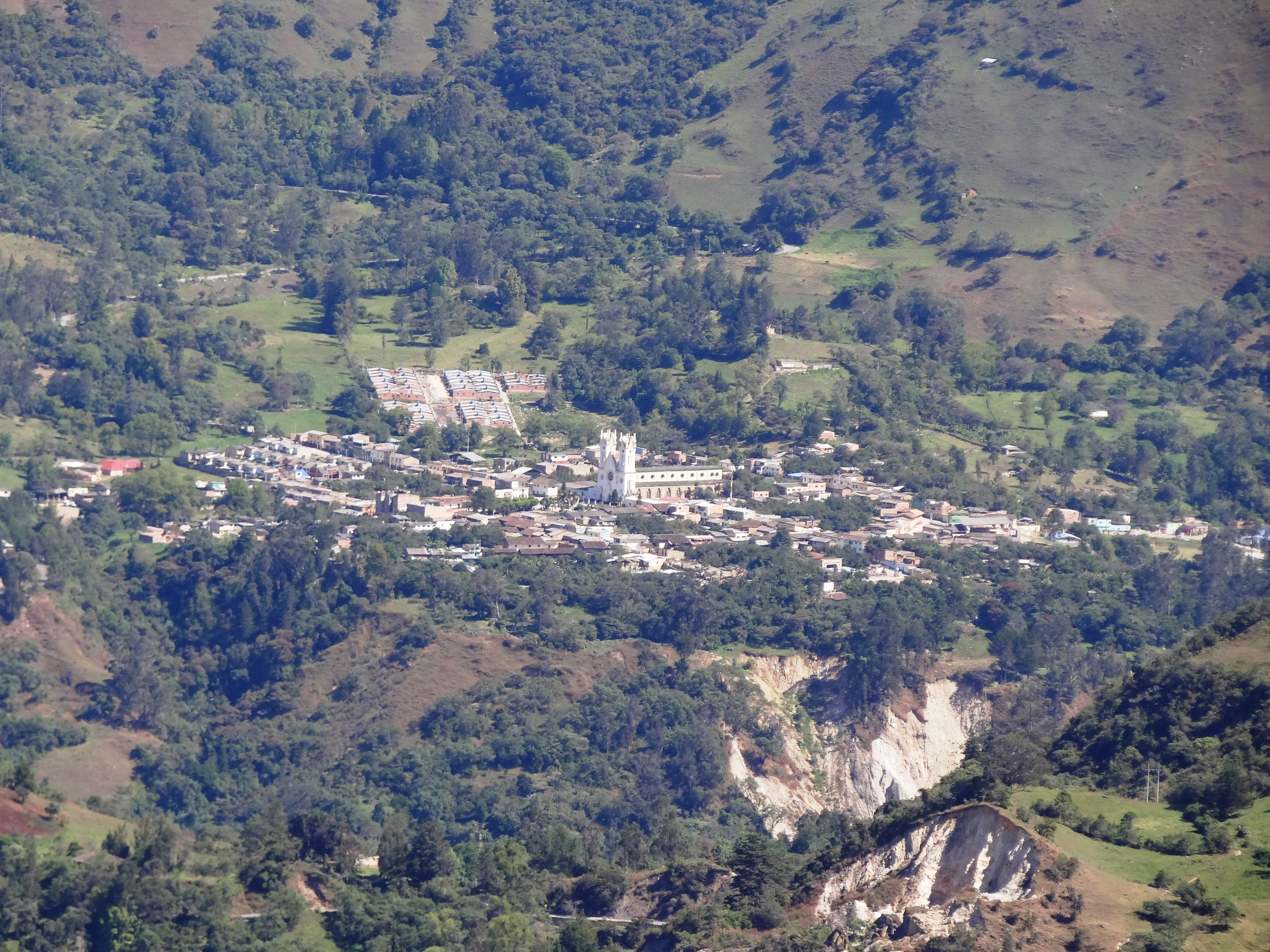
- View of San Mateo

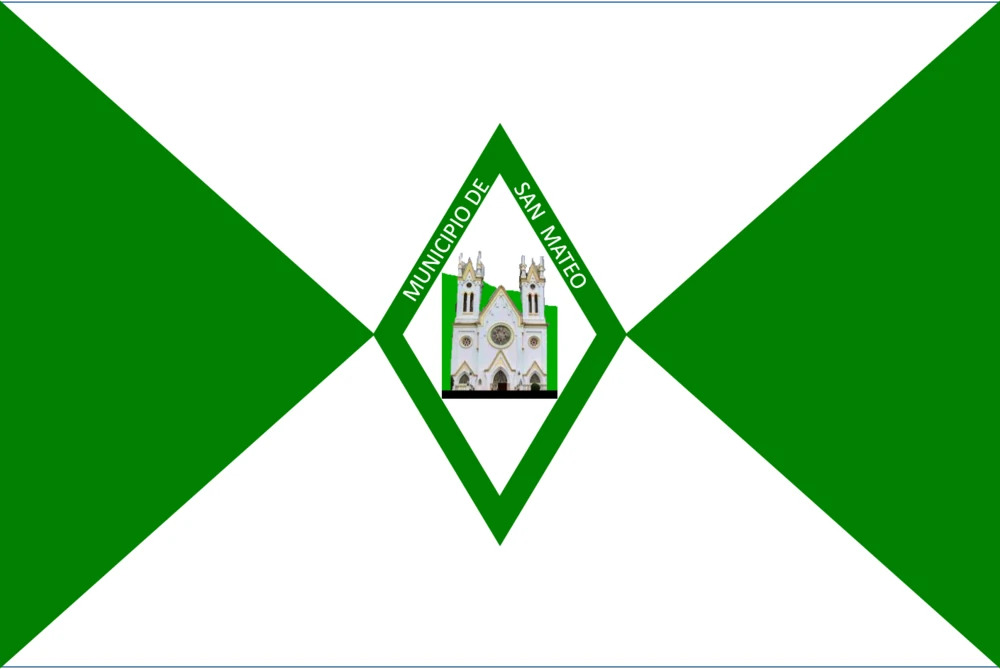
- Flag Coat of arms

- Location of the municipality and town of San Mateo in the Boyacá Department of Colombia
- Coordinates: 6°24′9″N 72°33′18″W
- Country: Colombia
- Department: Boyacá Department
- Province: Northern Boyacá Province
- Founded: 21 September 1773
- Founder: Antonio Caballero y Góngora (Note: In 1773, Caballero y Góngora was working in Córdoba, Spain)

Government
  - Mayor: Milton Díaz Bonilla (2020-2023)

Area
  - Total: 131 km^{2} (51 sq mi)
- Elevation: 2,500 m (8,200 ft)
- Time zone: UTC-5 (Colombia Standard Time)
- Website: Official website

San Mateo is a town and municipality in the Northern Boyacá Province, part of the Colombian department of Boyacá. The urban centre is located at an altitude of 2,500 metres (8,200 ft) in the Eastern Ranges of the Colombian Andes. San Mateo borders Guacamayas, Panqueba and El Cocuy in the east, Boavita in the west, Macaravita, Santander in the north and La Uvita in the south.

== Etymology ==
Before 1914, San Mateo was called La Capilla. It received its present name honouring the San Mateo field, where Antonio Ricaurte, hero of the Independence of Colombia died for the fatherland.

== History ==
The history of San Mateo is not well documented. The foundation of the town has been attributed by Ramón Correa to Archbishop of Bogotá Antonio Caballero y Góngora on September 21, 1773, while Caballero was working in Córdoba, Spain. Little data exists in the archives for the tumultuous period of civil wars of the republican era.

The symbol of San Mateo is the typical Colombian fruit chirimoya.

== Economy ==
The economy of San Mateo is centered around agriculture with potatoes, maize, beans, wheat, tobacco, pea and coffee as main products cultivated. The municipality also has livestock farming and mining activities of sand, gravel and carbon.

== Born in San Mateo ==
- Luis Espinosa, former professional cyclist
- Gregorio Ladino, former professional cyclist

== Gallery ==
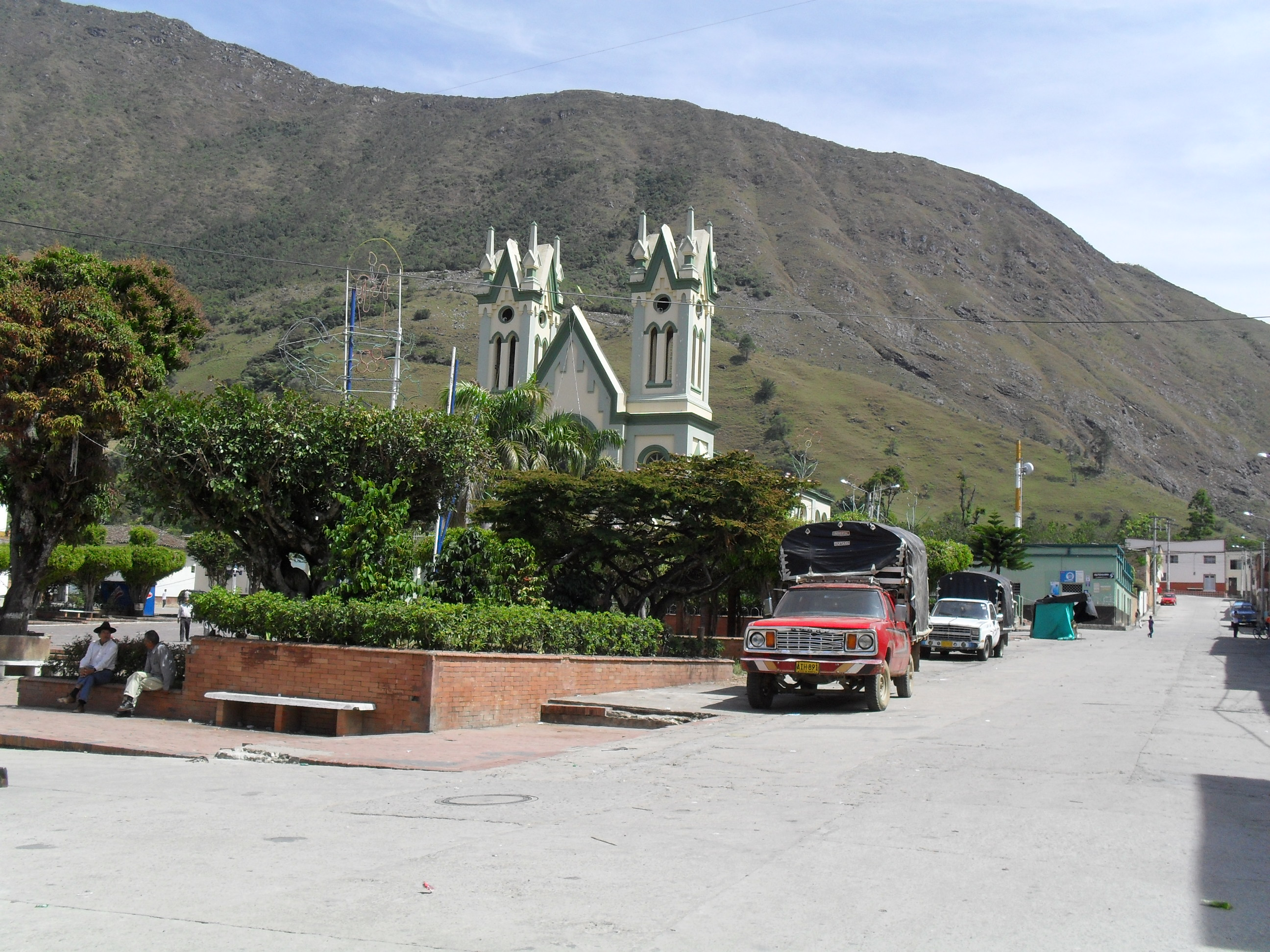
Central square

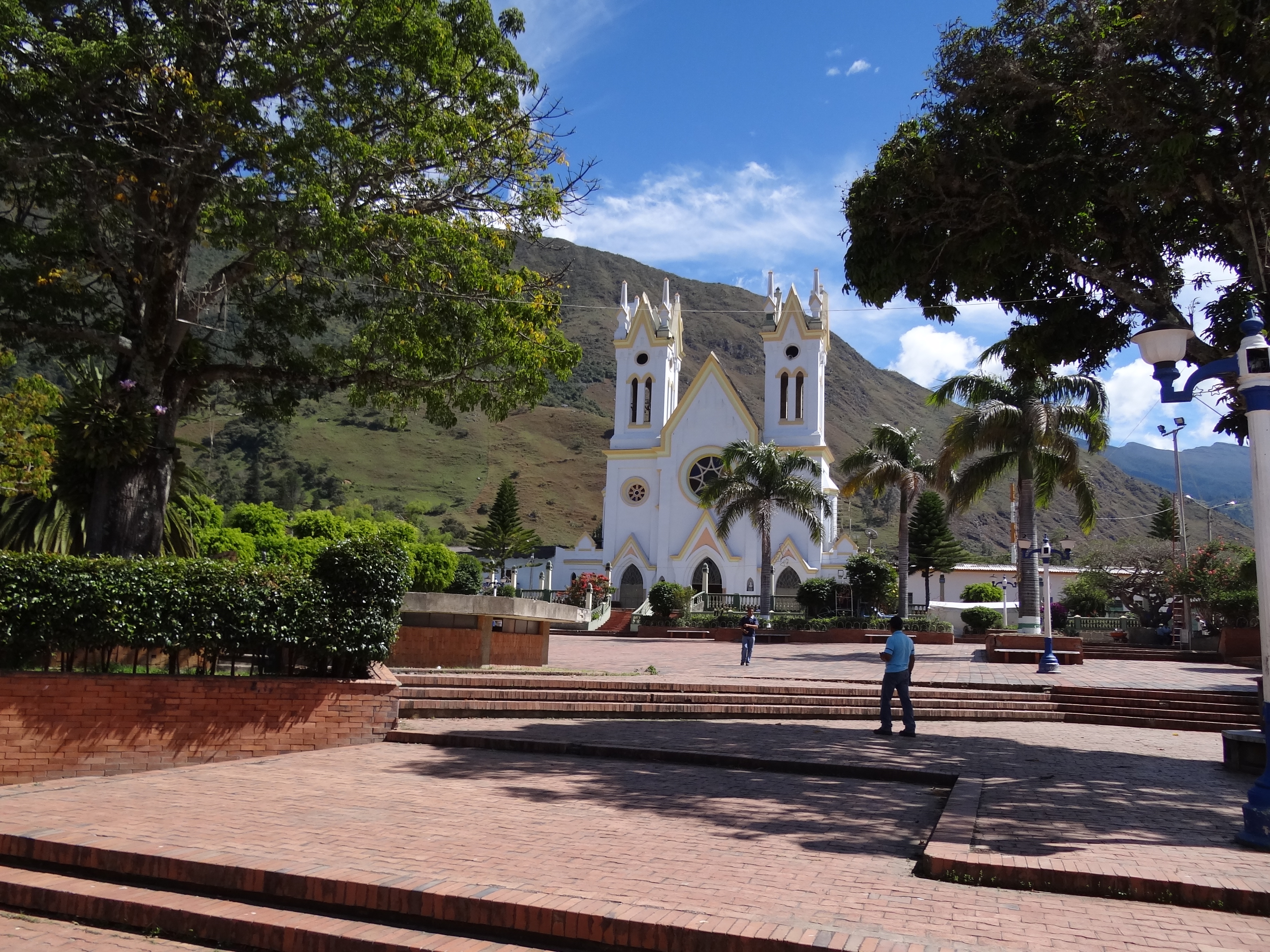
Central square and church

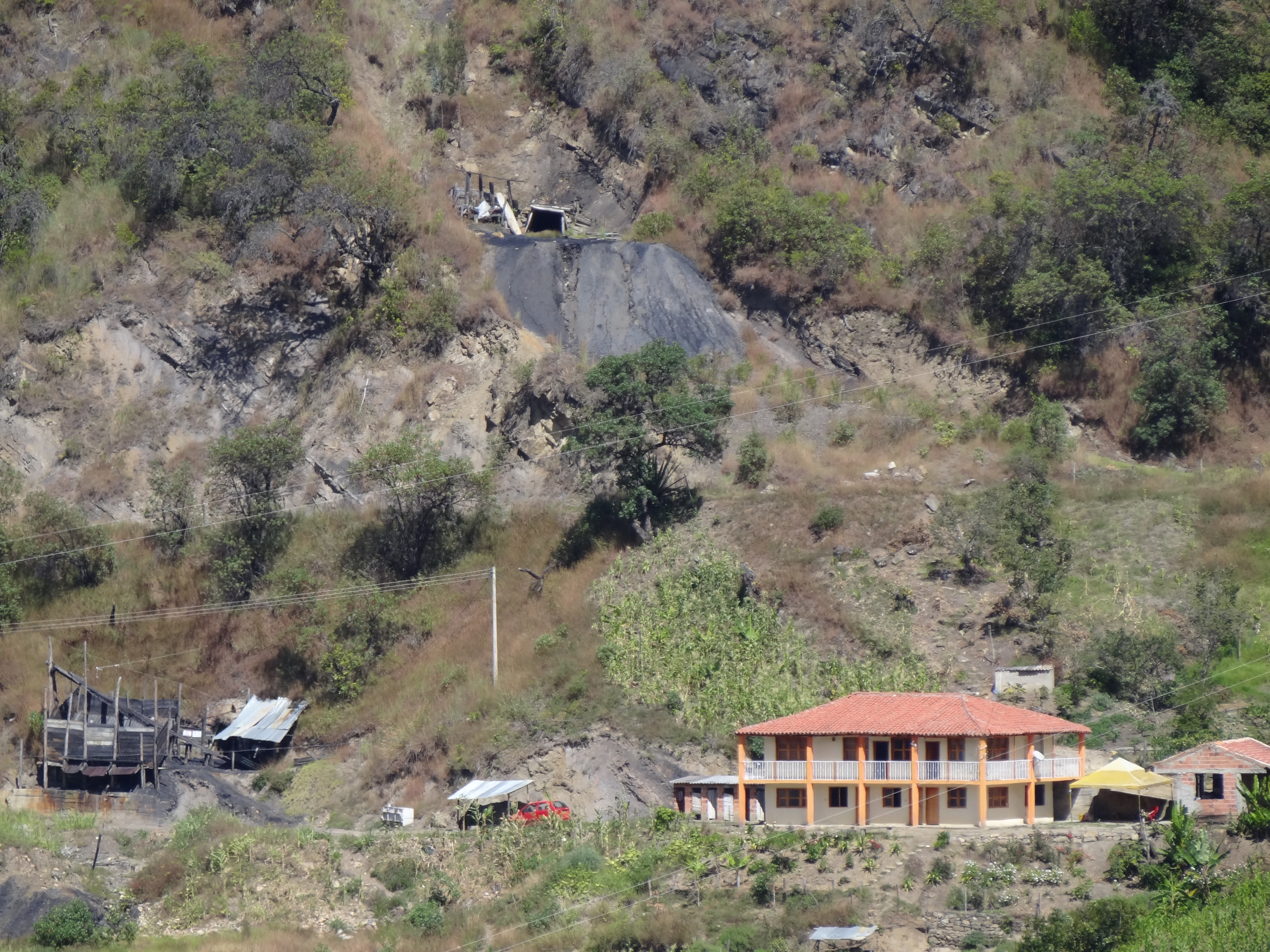
Carbon mining

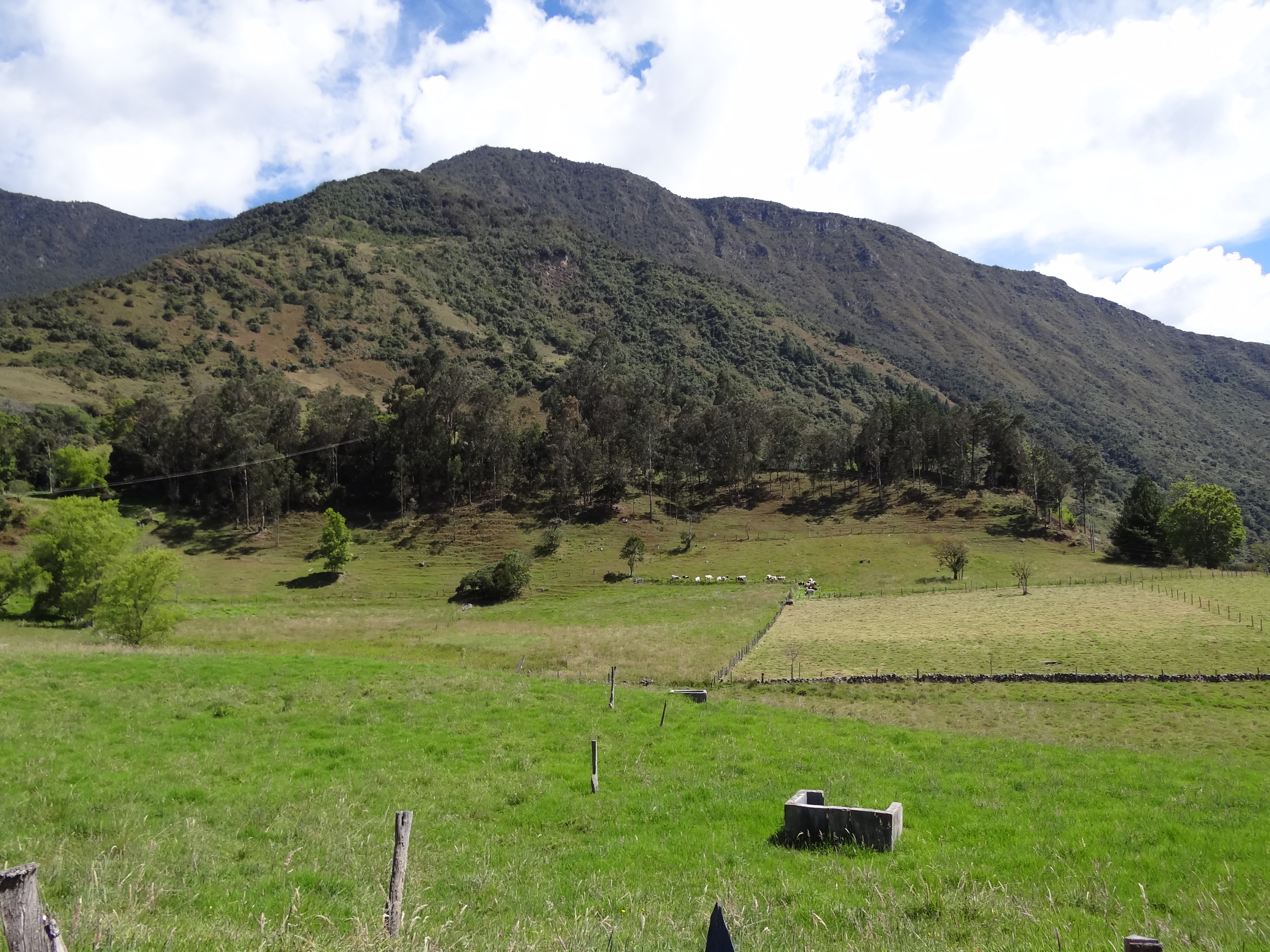
Livestock farming

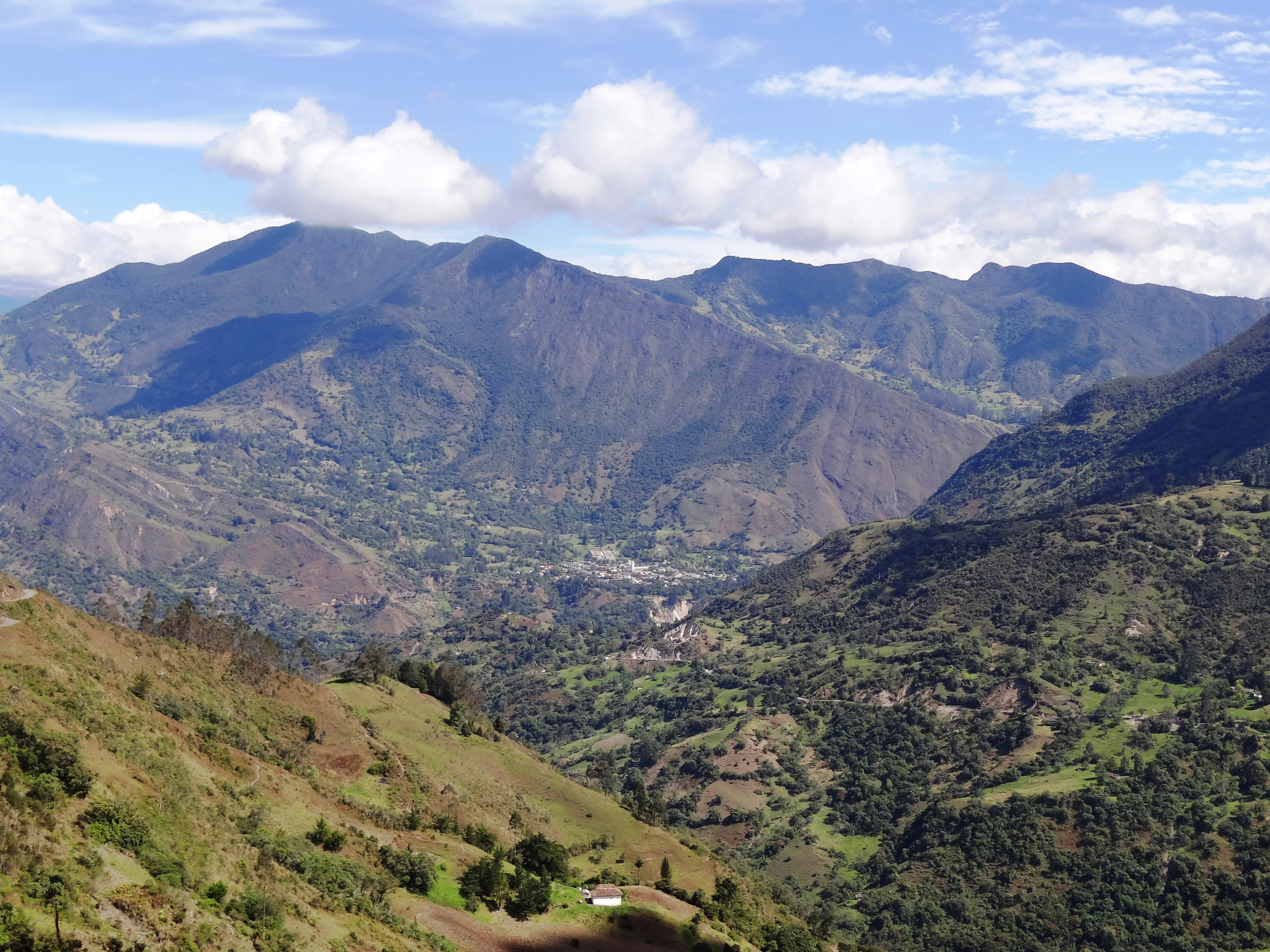
Landscape around San Mateo
