= La Uvita =

- Municipality and town
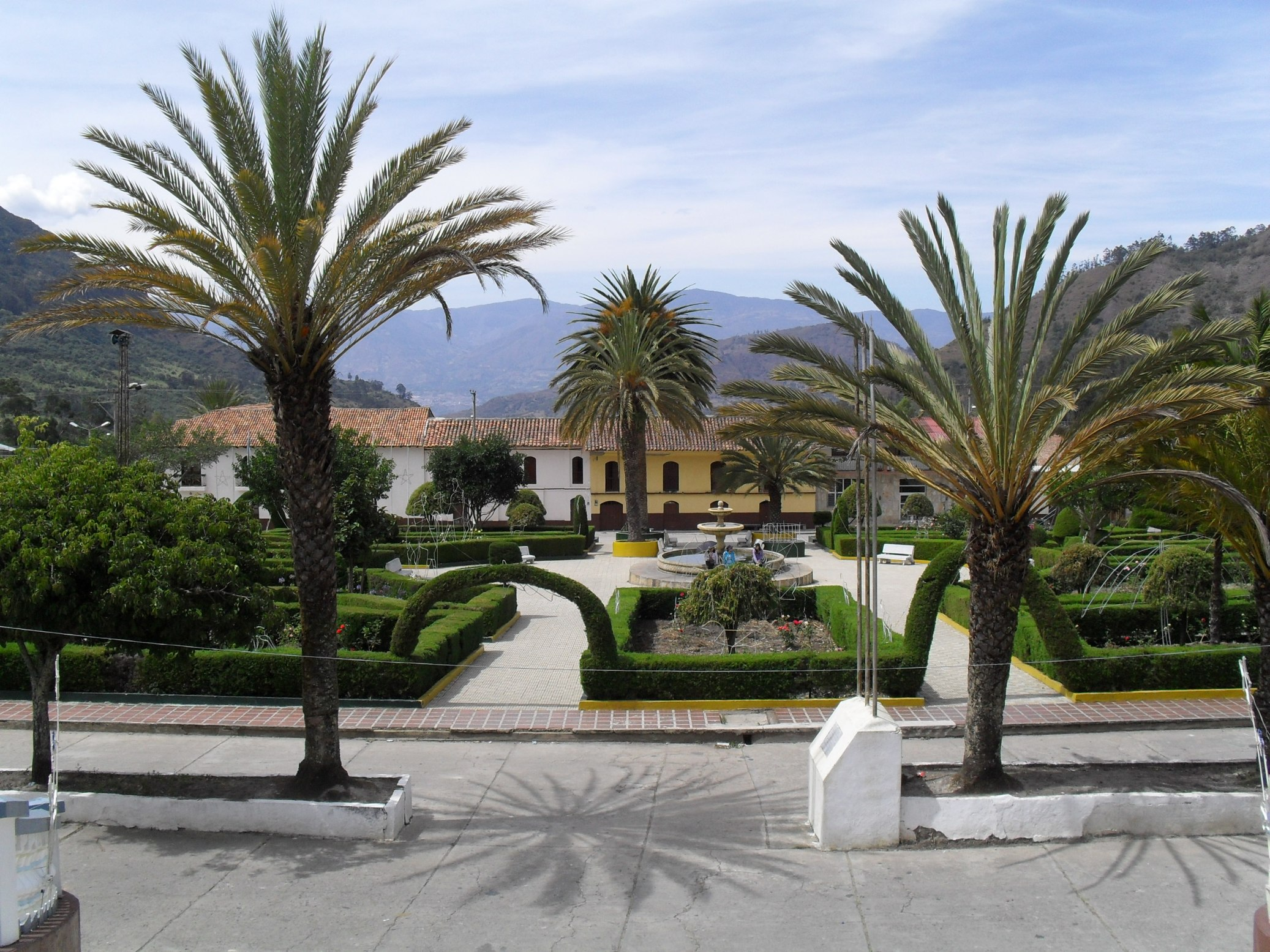
- Central square of La Uvita

- Flag

- Location of the municipality and town of La Uvita in the Boyacá Department of Colombia
- Coordinates: 6°20′N 72°30′W
- Country: Colombia
- Department: Boyacá Department
- Province: Northern Boyacá Province
- Founded: 24 December 1758
- Founder: Vicente Ferrer del Río de Loza

Government
  - Mayor: Ronald Gerardo Cordero Jaime (2020-2023)
- Elevation: 2,700 m (8,900 ft)

Population (2015)
  - Municipality and town: 2,523
  - Urban: 1,018
- Time zone: UTC-5 (Colombia Standard Time)
- Website: Official website

La Uvita is a town and municipality in the Northern Boyacá Province, part of the Colombian Department of Boyacá. The urban centre is located at an altitude of 2,700 metres (8,900 ft) in the Eastern Ranges of the Colombian Andes. La Uvita borders San Mateo in the north, El Cocuy and Chita in the east, Chita and Jericó in the south and Boavita in the west.

== Etymology ==
La Uvita is derived from Chibcha, meaning "meadow of the fertile farmlands".

== History ==
La Uvita was founded by Vicente Ferrer del Río de Loza on December 24, 1758, as a place for the colonial inhabitants of Boavita to flee the indigenous people in Boavita.

== Economy ==
Main economic activity of La Uvita is the manufacturing of cheese. It also serves as a touristic entry to the El Cocuy National Park.

== Climate ==
Climate data for La Uvita (Cusagui), elevation 2,950 m (9,680 ft), (1981–2010)
Month	Jan	Feb	Mar	Apr	May	Jun	Jul	Aug	Sep	Oct	Nov	Dec	Year
Mean daily maximum °C (°F)	19.2 (66.6)	19.8 (67.6)	19.2 (66.6)	17.7 (63.9)	17.6 (63.7)	17.2 (63.0)	16.5 (61.7)	17.0 (62.6)	17.4 (63.3)	17.5 (63.5)	17.2 (63.0)	18.4 (65.1)	17.9 (64.2)
Daily mean °C (°F)	12.7 (54.9)	12.6 (54.7)	12.7 (54.9)	12.8 (55.0)	12.8 (55.0)	12.3 (54.1)	11.8 (53.2)	12.0 (53.6)	12.1 (53.8)	12.3 (54.1)	12.5 (54.5)	12.8 (55.0)	12.4 (54.3)
Mean daily minimum °C (°F)	7.7 (45.9)	7.9 (46.2)	8.4 (47.1)	9.0 (48.2)	9.0 (48.2)	8.6 (47.5)	8.2 (46.8)	8.2 (46.8)	8.2 (46.8)	8.5 (47.3)	8.6 (47.5)	8.1 (46.6)	8.3 (46.9)
Average precipitation mm (inches)	35.4 (1.39)	53.7 (2.11)	88.2 (3.47)	145.5 (5.73)	110.8 (4.36)	55.3 (2.18)	55.9 (2.20)	53.7 (2.11)	75.0 (2.95)	133.0 (5.24)	113.8 (4.48)	59.2 (2.33)	979.5 (38.56)
Average precipitation days (≥ 1.0 mm)	7	9	13	17	18	16	19	18	15	19	17	10	177
Average relative humidity (%)	75	75	77	80	81	80	80	79	79	81	83	78	79
Source: Instituto de Hidrologia Meteorologia y Estudios Ambientales

== Gallery ==
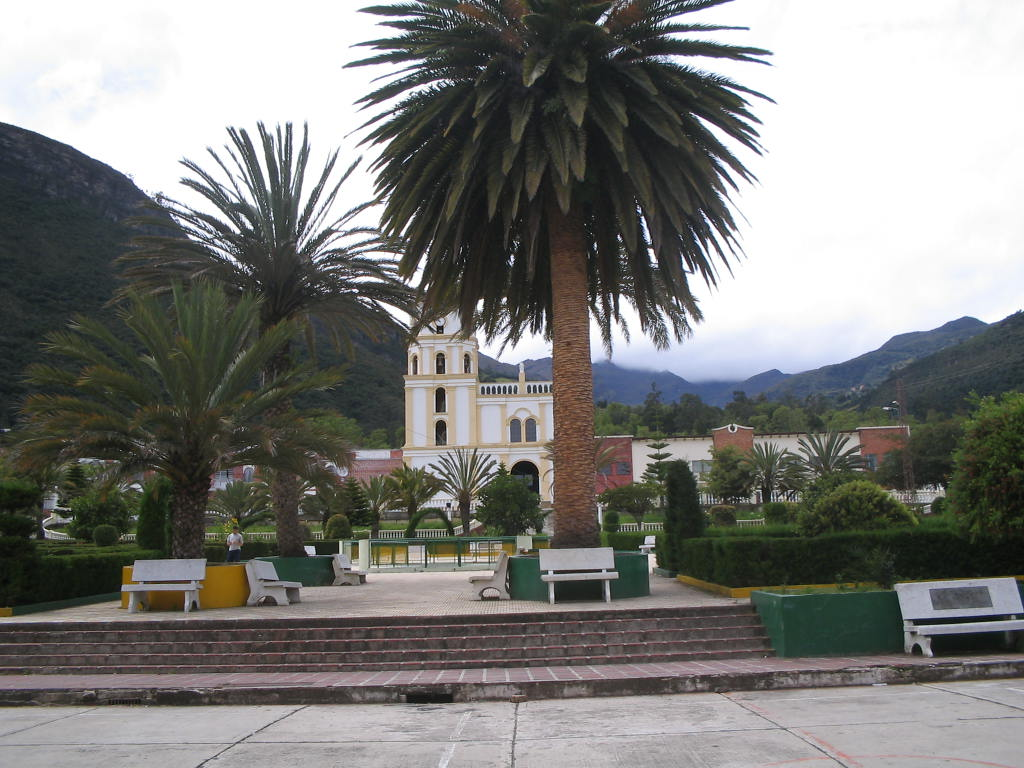
Central square

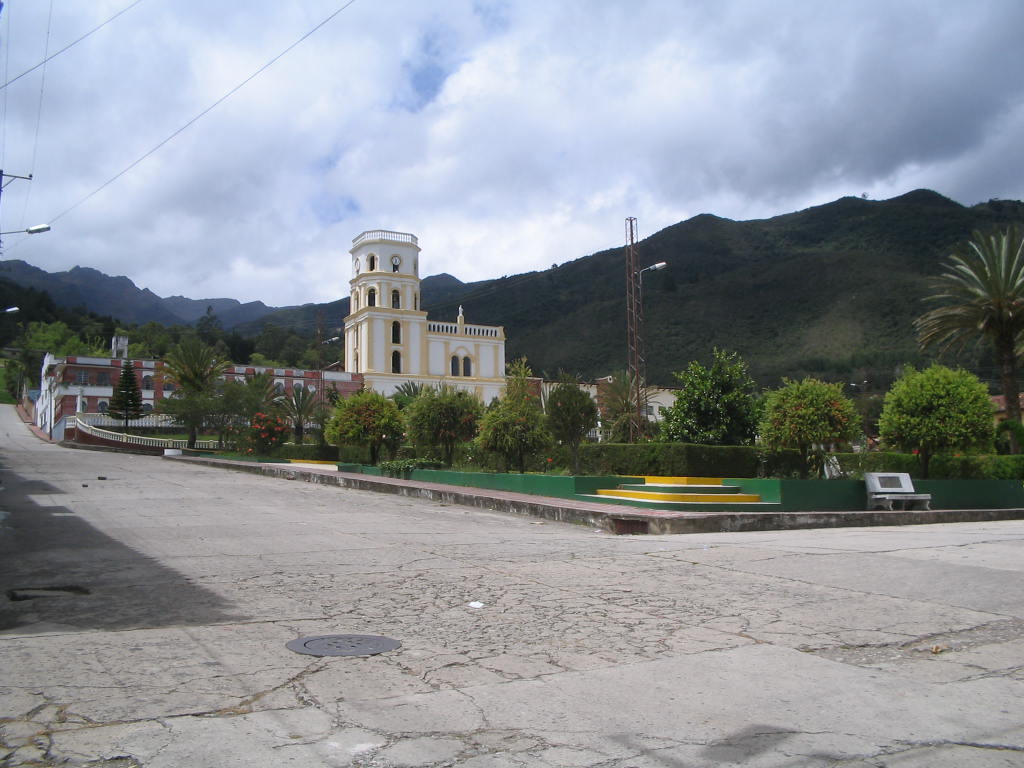
Central square and church

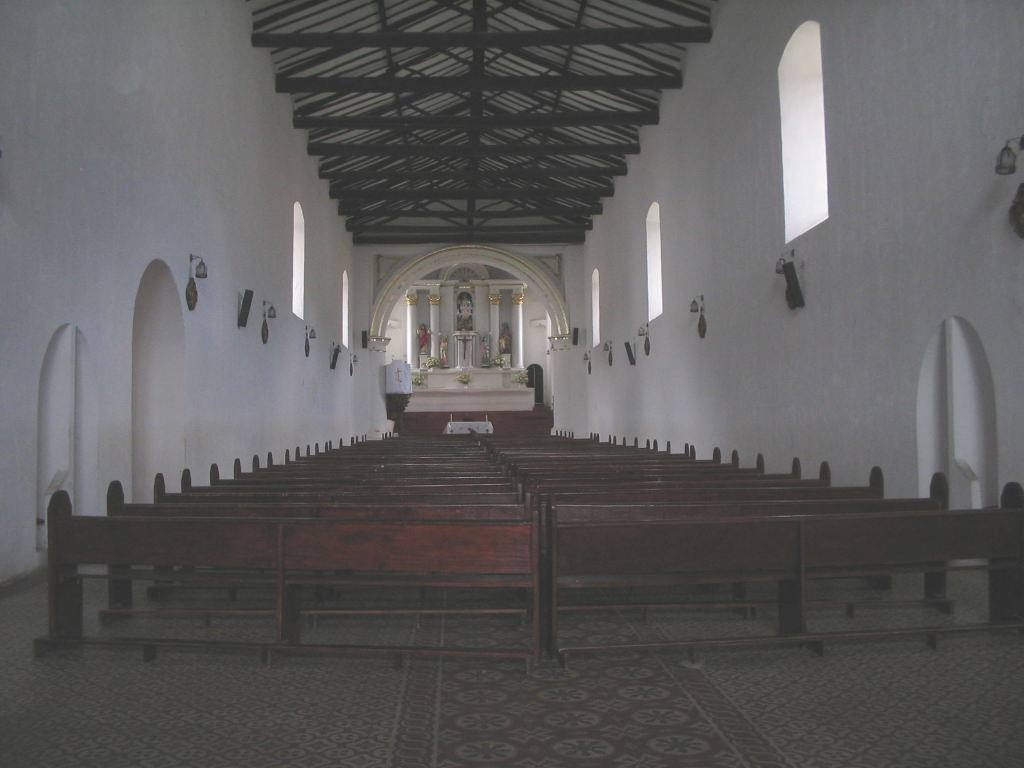
Church interior

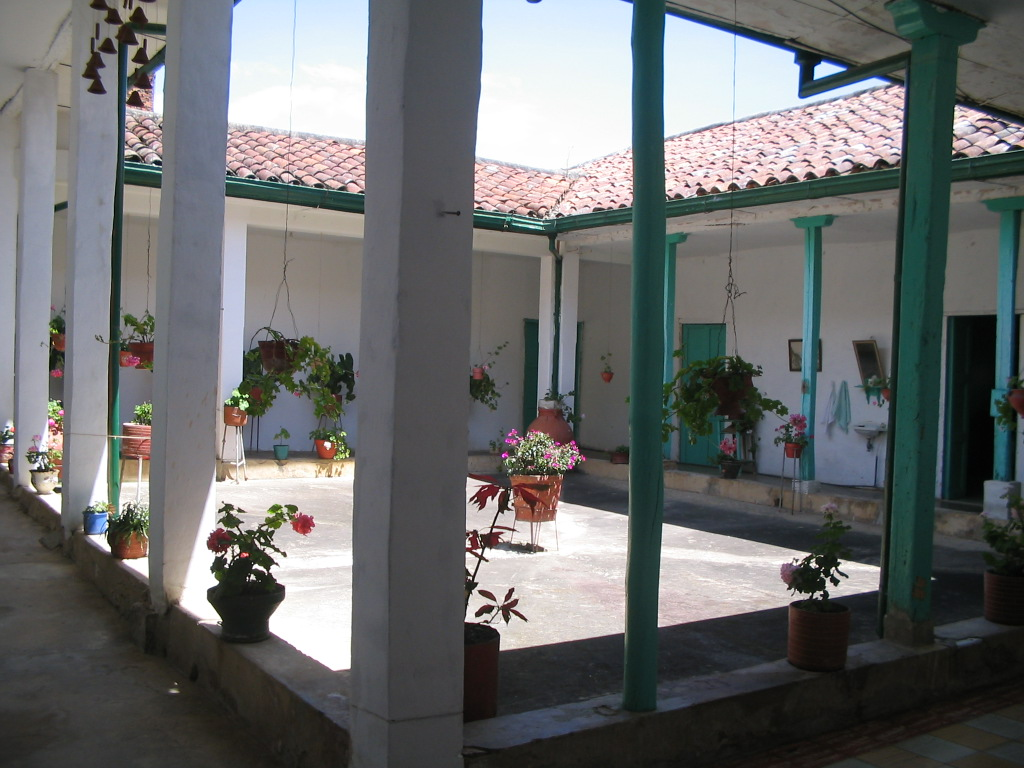
Andalusian patio
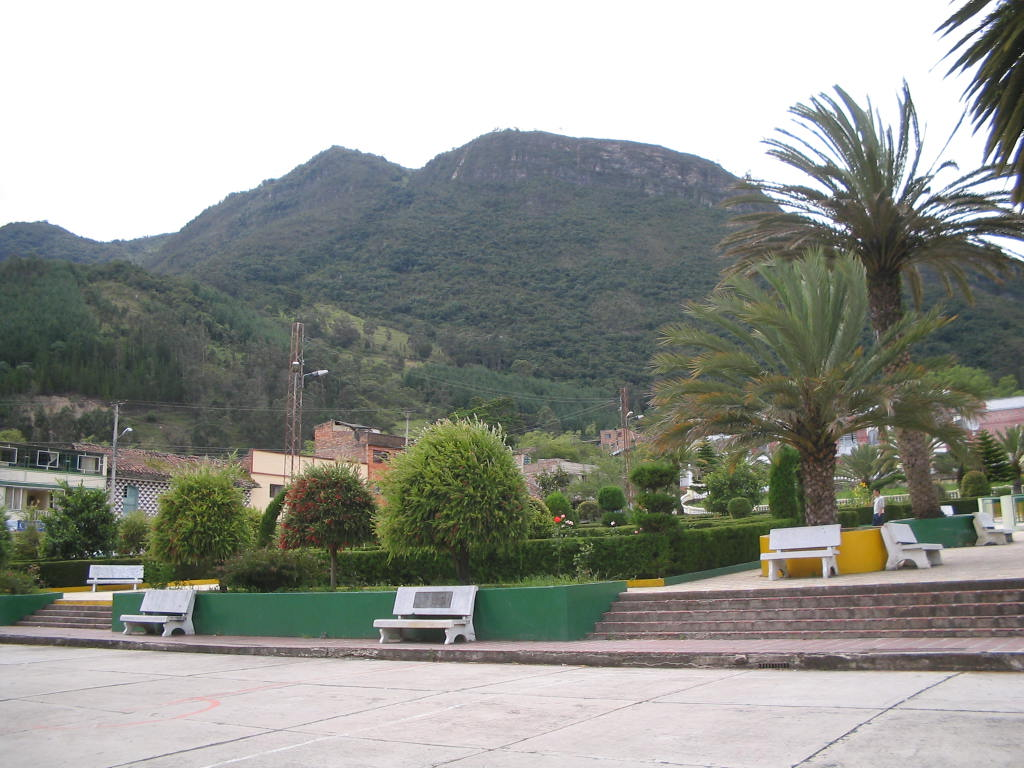
Monserrate Hill

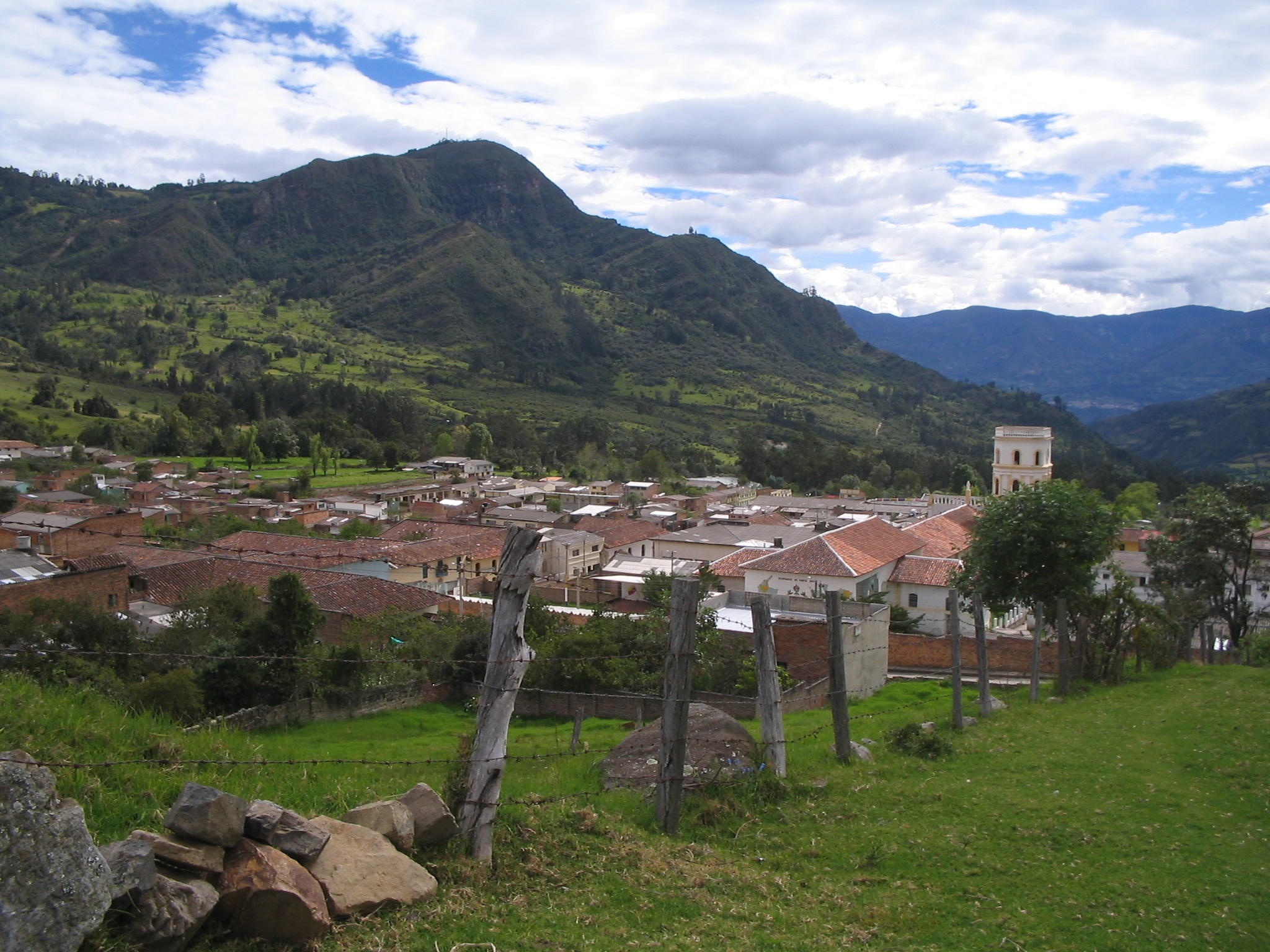
Tabor Hill

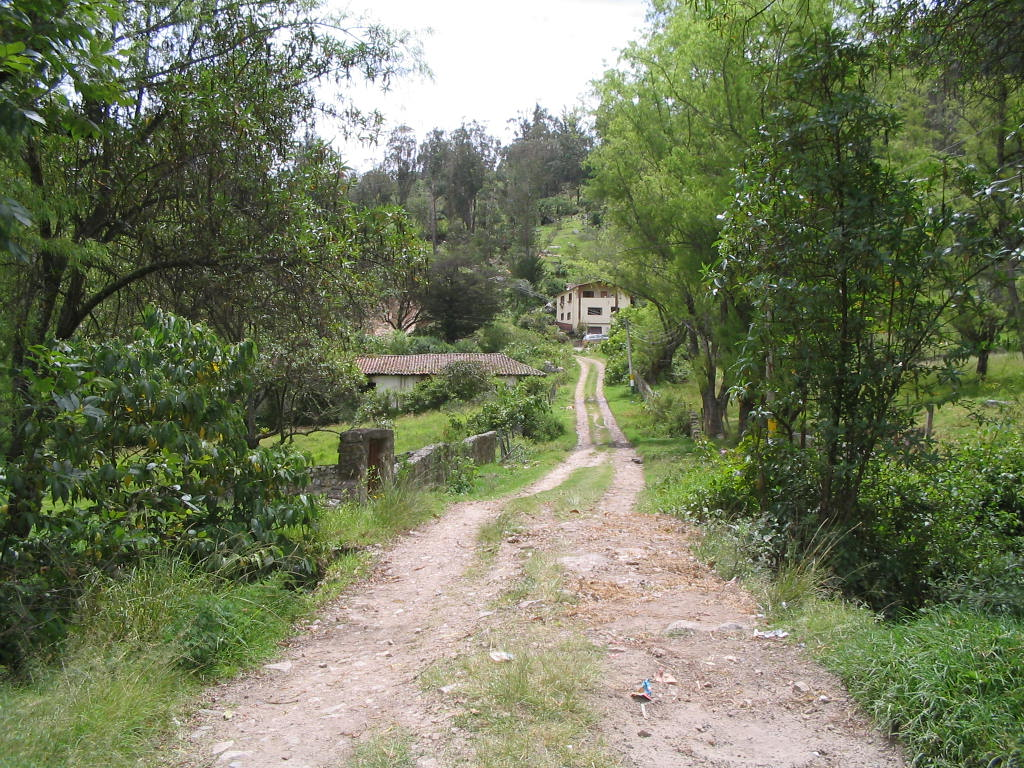
Rural road
