= Boavita =

Coordinates: 6°20′N 72°35′W

- Municipality and town
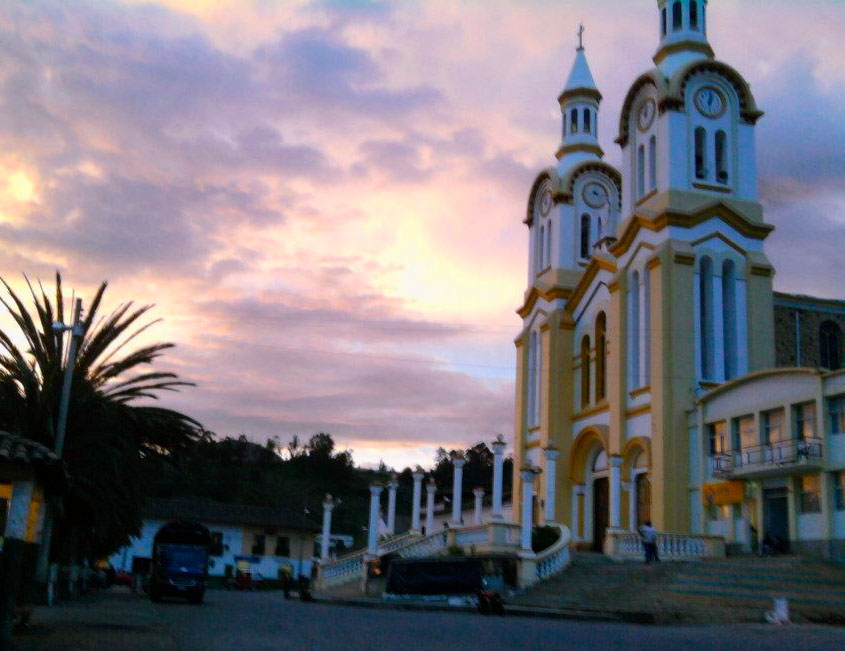
- Church of Boavita

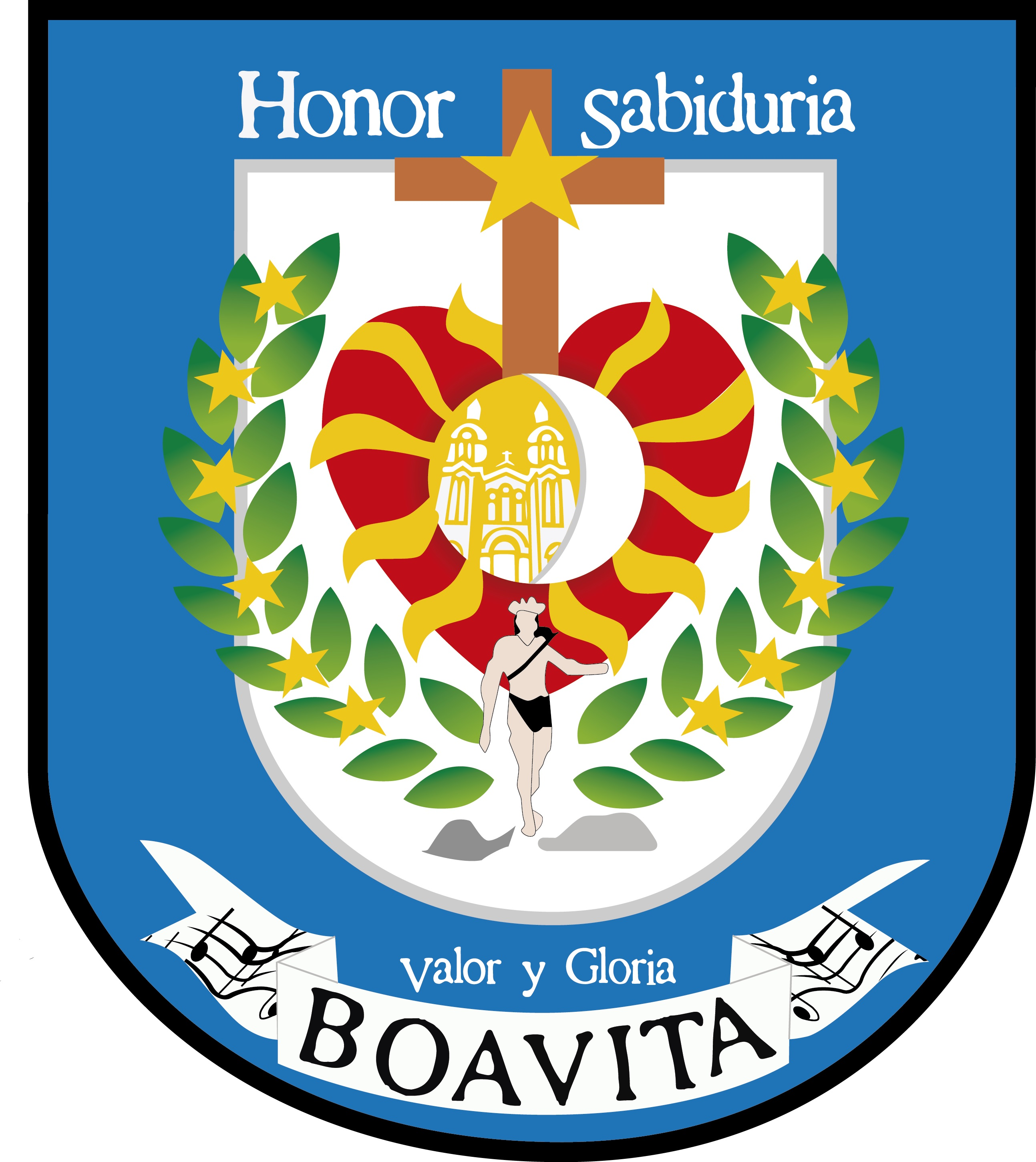
- Flag Coat of arms

- Location of the municipality and town of Boavita in the Boyacá department of Colombia
- Country: Colombia
- Department: Boyacá Department
- Province: Northern Boyacá Province
- Founded: 9 February 1613

Government
  - Mayor: Fabio Figueroa Jiménez (2020-2023)

Area
  - Municipality and town: 159 km^{2} (61 sq mi)
- Elevation: 2,114 m (6,936 ft)

Population (2015)
  - Municipality and town: 7,079
  - Density: 44.5/km^{2} (115/sq mi)
  - Urban: 2,929
- Time zone: UTC-5 (Colombia Standard Time)
- Website: Official website

Boavita is a town and municipality in the Colombian Department of Boyacá, part of the subregion of the Northern Boyacá Province. The urban centre of Boavita is situated in the Eastern Ranges of the Colombian Andes at an altitude of 2,114 metres (6,936 ft) and a distance of 184 kilometres (114 mi) from the department capital Tunja. The municipality borders Capitanejo, Santander, and the Nevado River in the north, San Mateo and La Uvita in the east, Tipacoque and Soatá in the west and Susacón in the south.

== Etymology ==
The name of Boavita is derived from Chibcha and doesn't mean "good life", but rather "Point on the hill worshipping the Sun" or "Gate of the Sun".

== History ==
The area of modern Boavita in the times before the Spanish conquest of the Muisca was inhabited by a tribe called "Guavitas", pertaining to the Laches and Muisca. It was ruled by a cacique who was loyal to the Tundama of Tundama.

Modern Boavita was founded on February 9, 1613, by Sr. Hugarte.

== Economy ==
Main economical activities of Boavita are agriculture, livestock farming and mining. Main agricultural products cultivated are dates, sugarcane, yuca, coffee, cotton, potatoes, maize, chick peas, beans, peas, wheat and arracacha. The mining activities exist of carbon exploitation.

== Climate ==
Boavita has a subtropical highland climate (Köppen: Cfb) with moderate temperatures throughout the year.

Climate data for Boavita, elevation 2,150 m (7,050 ft), (1981–2010)
Month	Jan	Feb	Mar	Apr	May	Jun	Jul	Aug	Sep	Oct	Nov	Dec	Year
Mean daily maximum °C (°F)	25.3 (77.5)	25.6 (78.1)	25.2 (77.4)	24.0 (75.2)	23.4 (74.1)	23.2 (73.8)	23.5 (74.3)	23.9 (75.0)	23.9 (75.0)	23.3 (73.9)	23.2 (73.8)	24.1 (75.4)	24 (75)
Daily mean °C (°F)	17.9 (64.2)	18.0 (64.4)	18.1 (64.6)	17.5 (63.5)	17.1 (62.8)	17.1 (62.8)	16.9 (62.4)	17.2 (63.0)	17.1 (62.8)	16.9 (62.4)	17.1 (62.8)	17.4 (63.3)	17.4 (63.3)
Mean daily minimum °C (°F)	10.7 (51.3)	11.1 (52.0)	11.6 (52.9)	12.2 (54.0)	12.2 (54.0)	11.7 (53.1)	11.2 (52.2)	11.3 (52.3)	11.2 (52.2)	11.7 (53.1)	11.8 (53.2)	11.1 (52.0)	11.5 (52.7)
Average precipitation mm (inches)	43.0 (1.69)	66.6 (2.62)	102.4 (4.03)	191.5 (7.54)	166.2 (6.54)	81.5 (3.21)	61.0 (2.40)	76.1 (3.00)	110.6 (4.35)	180.3 (7.10)	139.4 (5.49)	62.9 (2.48)	1,281.5 (50.45)
Average precipitation days (≥ 1.0 mm)	7	10	13	20	21	17	17	16	18	22	19	12	193
Average relative humidity (%)	71	71	73	79	81	79	77	75	77	80	80	77	77
Mean monthly sunshine hours	241.8	197.6	186.0	141.0	133.3	141.0	161.2	158.1	147.0	155.0	171.0	210.8	2,043.8
Mean daily sunshine hours	7.8	7.0	6.0	4.7	4.3	4.7	5.2	5.1	4.9	5.0	5.7	6.8	5.6
Source: Instituto de Hidrologia Meteorologia y Estudios Ambientales

== Gallery ==
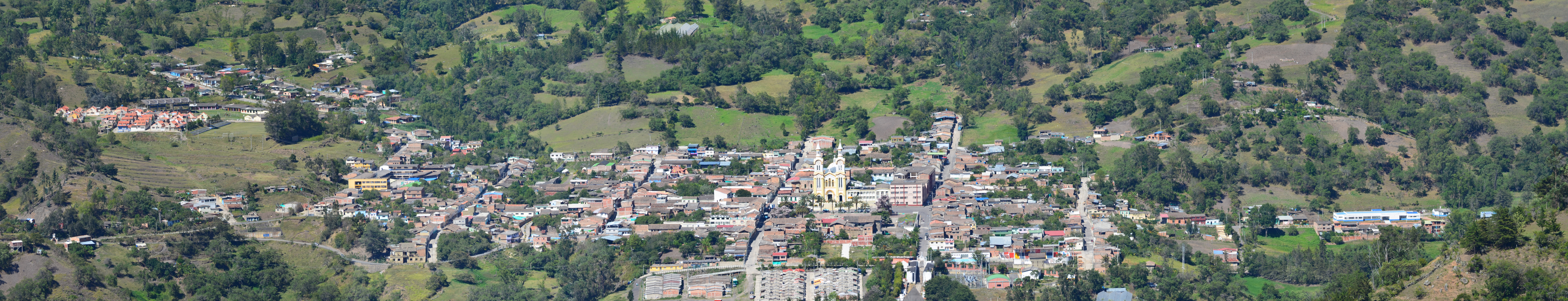
Panorama of Boavita
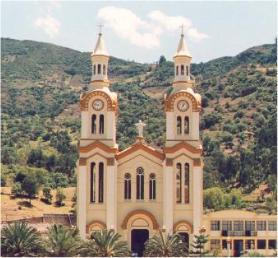
Church of Boavita

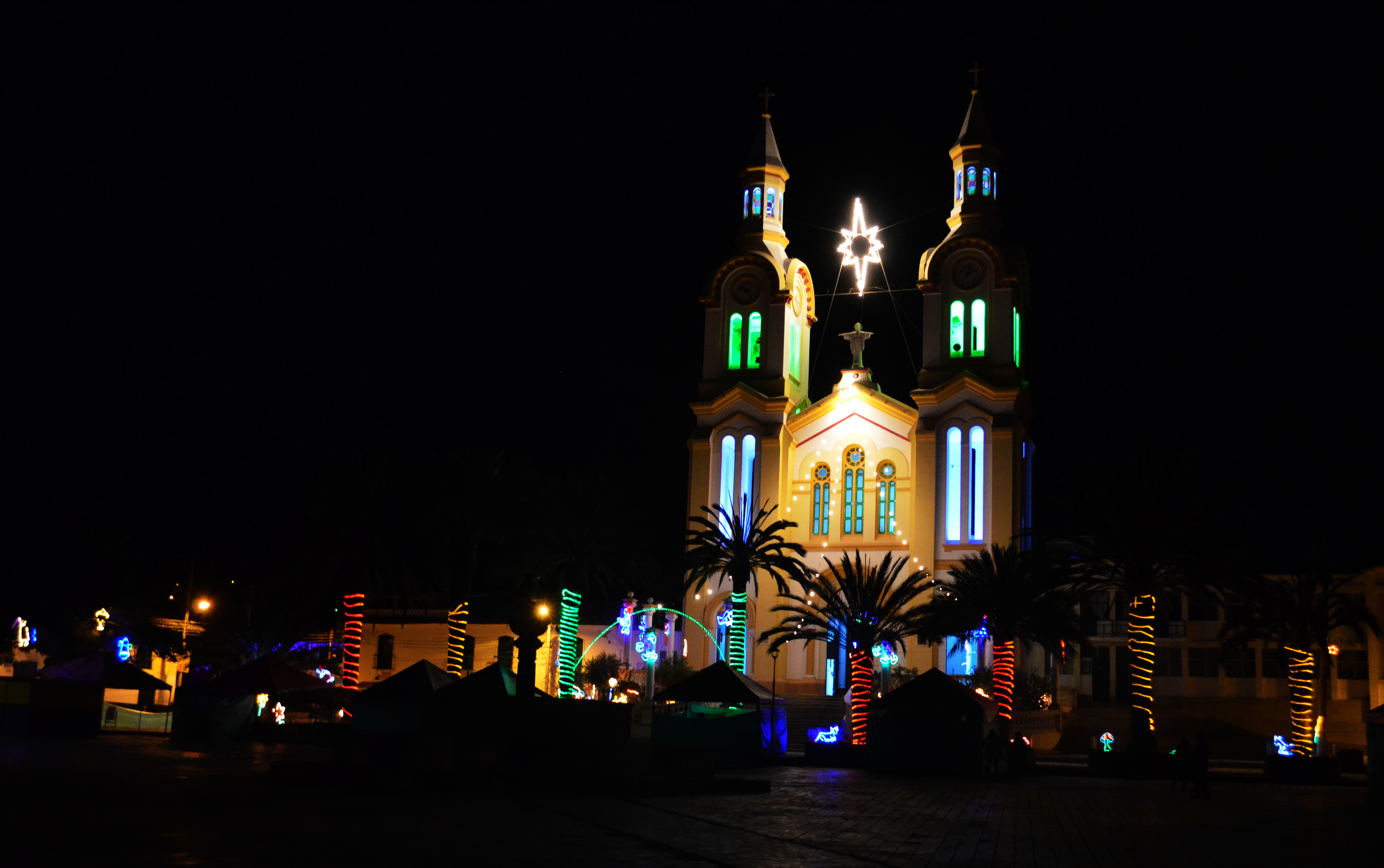
Church with Christmas

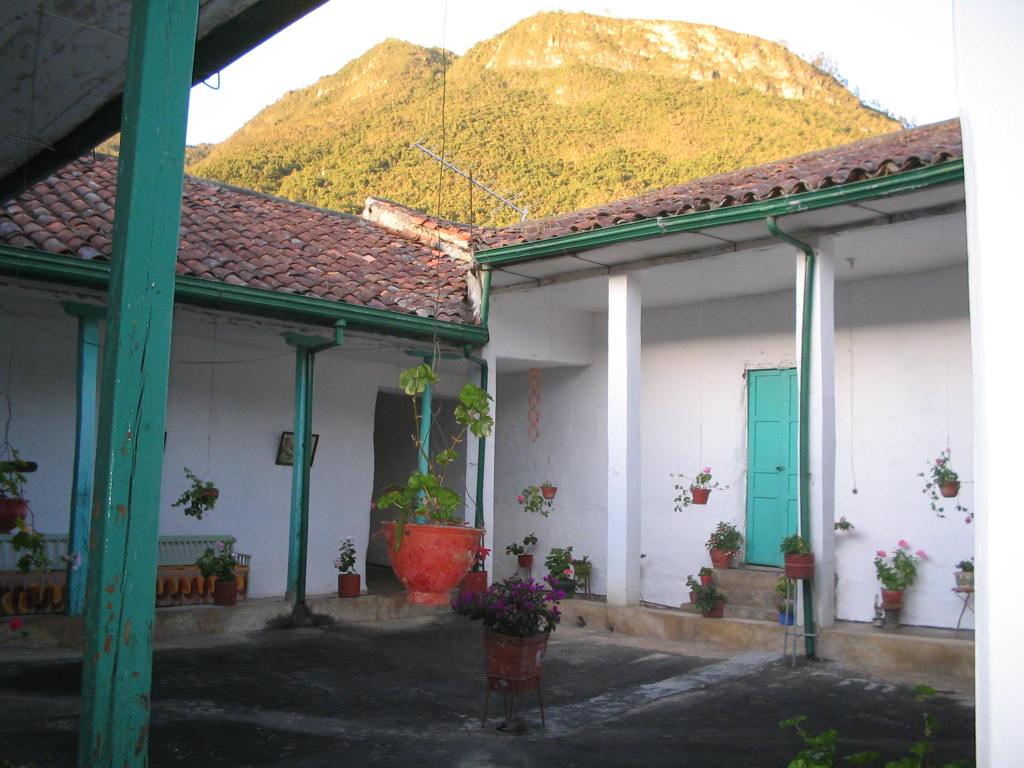
Colonial house

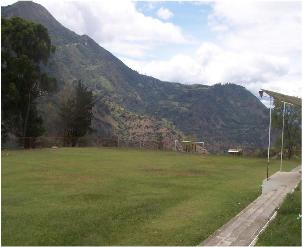
Outside the urban centre
