= Soatá =

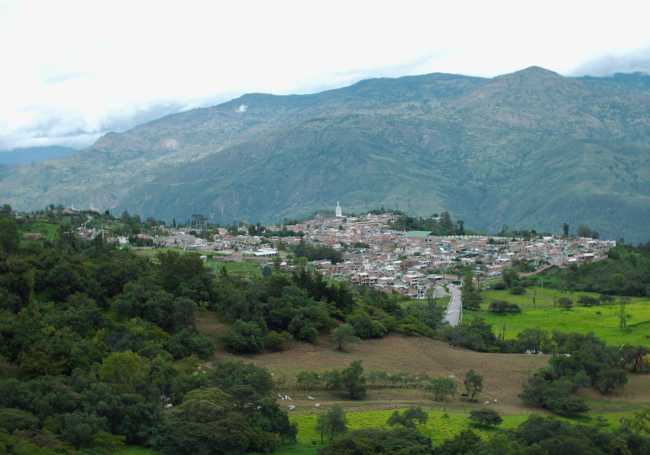
- View of Soatá

- Flag

- Location of the town and municipality of Soatá in Boyacá Department

- Location in Colombia
- Coordinates: 6°20′N 72°40′W
- Country: Colombia
- Department: Boyacá
- Province: Northern Boyacá Province
- Founded: 10 December 1545
- Founder: Juan Rodríguez Parra

Government
  - Type: Municipality
  - Mayor: Carlos Javier Gutiérrez Sandoval (2020-2023)

Area
  - City: 136 km^{2} (53 sq mi)
- Elevation: 1,950 m (6,400 ft)

Population (2016)
  - City: 7,069
  - Density: 52.0/km^{2} (135/sq mi)
  - Urban: 5,237
- Website: Official website

Soatá is a town and municipality in Boyacá Department, Colombia. Soatá is located on the western slopes of the Cordillera Oriental mountain range, at the northeast end of the Department of Boyacá. It is the capital of the Northern Boyacá Province. Soatá borders Boavita in the east, Tipacoque in the north, Susacón in the south and in the west it borders the municipality Onzaga of the department of Santander.

== Climate ==
Soatá - 1950 m

Climate chart (precipitation, max. and min. temperature)
J	F	M	A	M	J	J	A	S	O	N	D
41 25 12	58 25 12	88 25 13	271 24 13	241 23 13	126 23 13	101 23 12	103 23 13	155 24 13	260 23 13	163 23 13	84 24 12
- █ Average max. and min. temperatures in °C
- █ Precipitation totals in mm
- Source: Climate-data.org - Soatá
Imperial conversion
J	F	M	A	M	J	J	A	S	O	N	D
1.6 76 54	2.3 77 54	3.5 77 55	11 75 56	9.5 74 56	5 73 55	4 74 54	4.1 74 55	6.1 74 55	10 74 55	6.4 74 55	3.3 75 54
- █ Average max. and min. temperatures in °F
- █ Precipitation totals in inches

== Etymology ==
Soatá in the Chibcha language of the Muisca means tillage of the Sun.

== History ==
Soatá was already populated during the Herrera Period and at the time of the Spanish conquest, Soatá was inhabited by the Muisca. The village was part of the rule of the cacique Tundama from the city with the same name, presently known as Duitama.

The inhabitants of Soatá are descendants of a mix of Muisca, Caribbean and Choques. Modern Soatá was founded by sergeant Juan Rodríguez Parra in 1545.

== Demographics and geography ==
In 2005 Soatá had a population of 8.730 inhabitants of which 63% living in the urban zone and 47% live in the eight subdivisions that comprise the rural area. The subdivisions (veredas) are: Los Molinos, La Laguna, Llano Grande, El Espinal, La Chorrera and La Costa. The urban center of Soatá is located at an elevation of 1,950 metres (6,400 ft) above sea level.

== Economy ==
Its economy is of subsistence and it characterizes by agriculture and the cattle ranch in form of minifundios, standing out the cultures of the sugar cane, coffee, tobacco, tomatoes, maize, wheat, barley, fruit trees, dates and flowers.

The cattle sector is distinguished by the presence of goat, pigs and cows.

In the industrial sector, one stands out the production of bricks, floor pieces, canvas shoes, straw hats, panela and bee honey; it excels the elaboration of candies and treats. The production of dates has gained Soatá the title of city of the date palm of Colombia.

Soatá counts on tourist potential by the wealth of its cultural expressions, standing out its gastronomy, natural variety of landscapes and scenic places.

== Paleontology ==
In the Soatá Formation, a brown shale and siltstone sequence defined in and named after Soatá, fossil remains of the Pleistocene genera Neochoerus, Odocoileus and the species Haplomastodon waringi have been found.

== Tourism ==
Touristic sites of Soatá are:

- Chicamocha Canyon
- Pinzón Bridge
- El Chorro

Soatá is becoming a popular destination for birders, as a number of Colombian endemic species can be found in the area, including Chestnut-bellied hummingbird, Niceforo's wren, Colombian mountain grackle and Apical flycatcher.

== Related to Soatá ==
- Cayo Leonidas Peñuela
- Lorenzo Cárdenas

== Festivals ==
- Our Lady of Mount Carmel Festival
- Torbellino's Festival

== Gallery ==
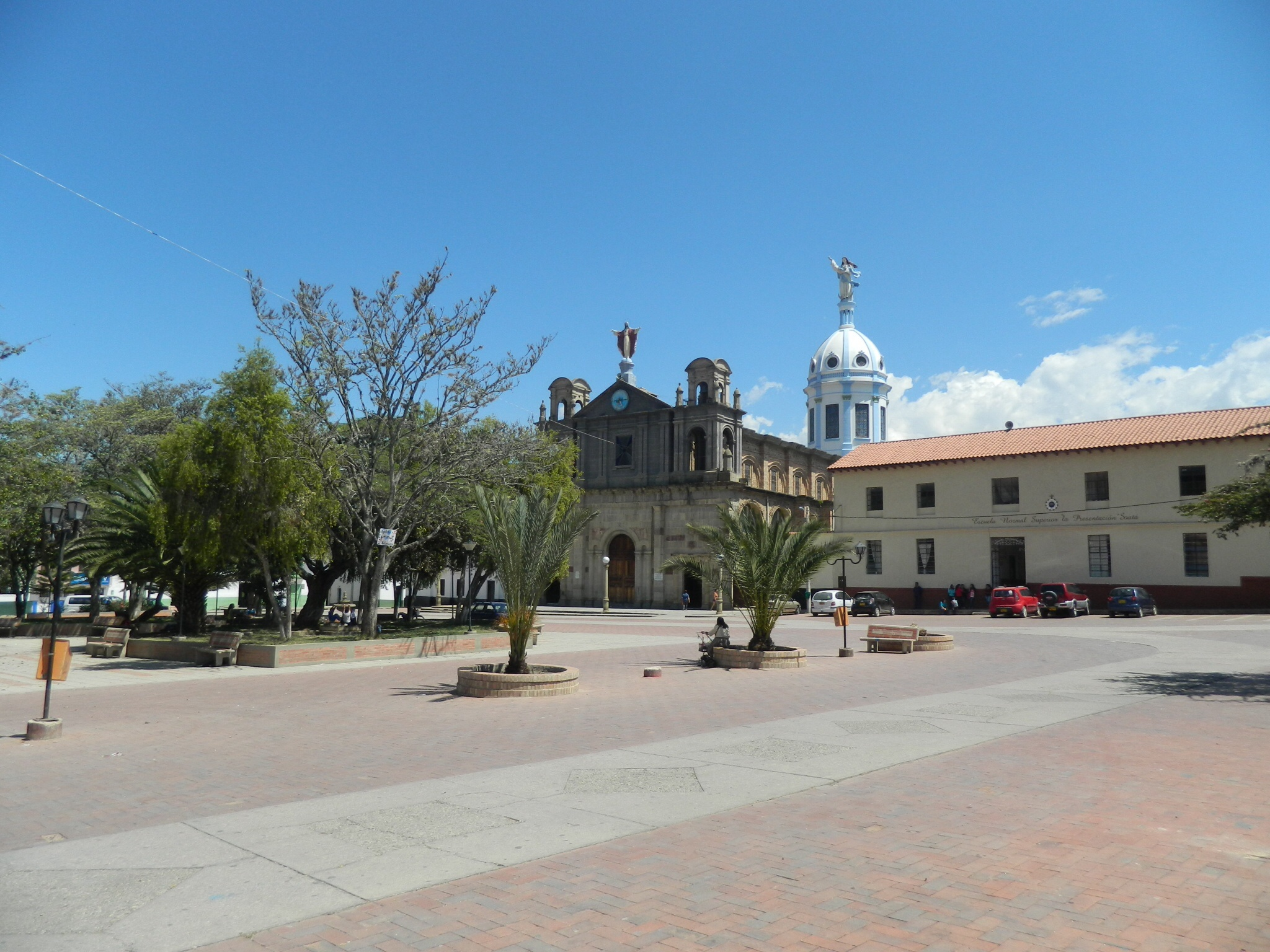
Central square

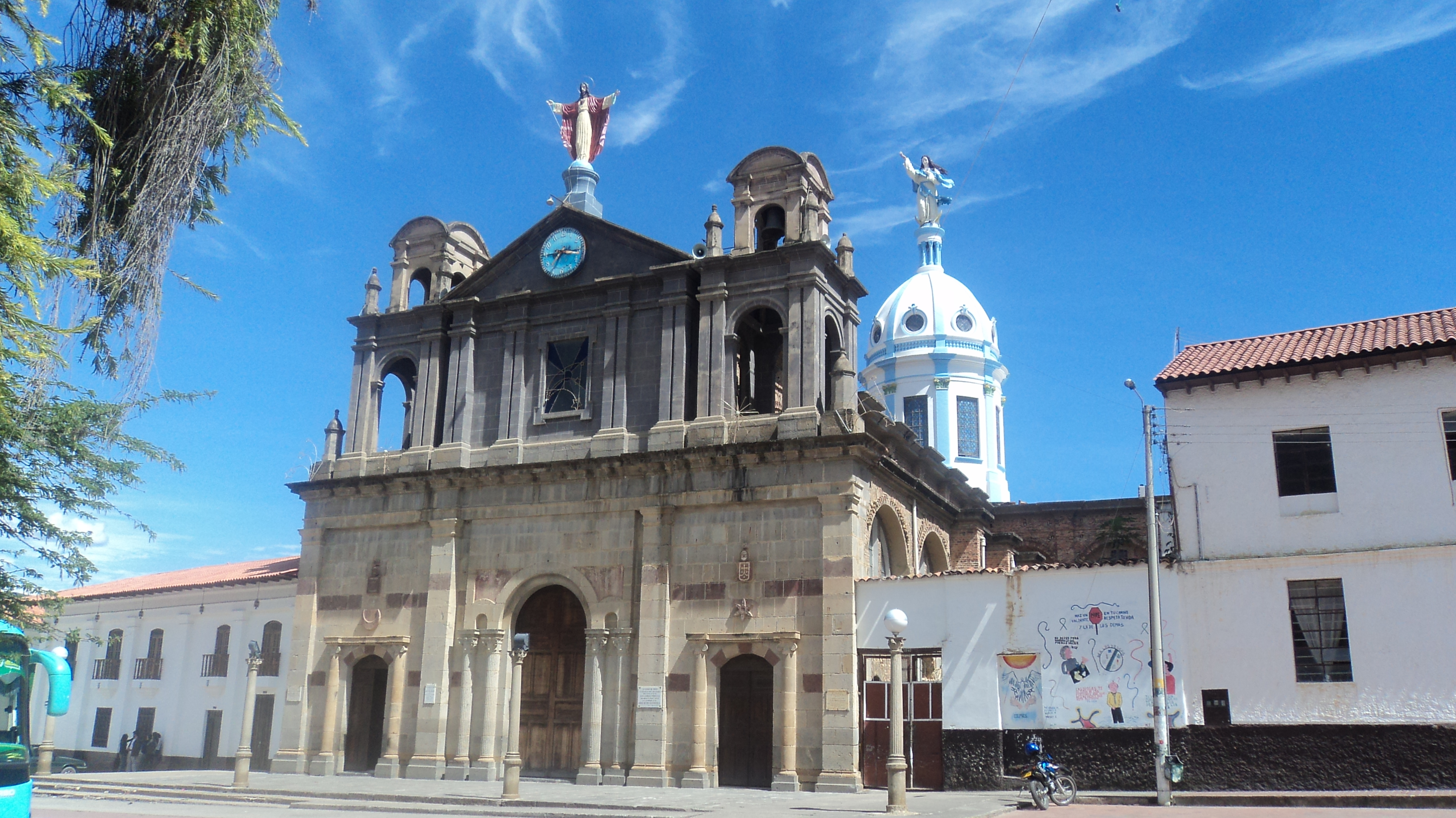
Church of Soatá

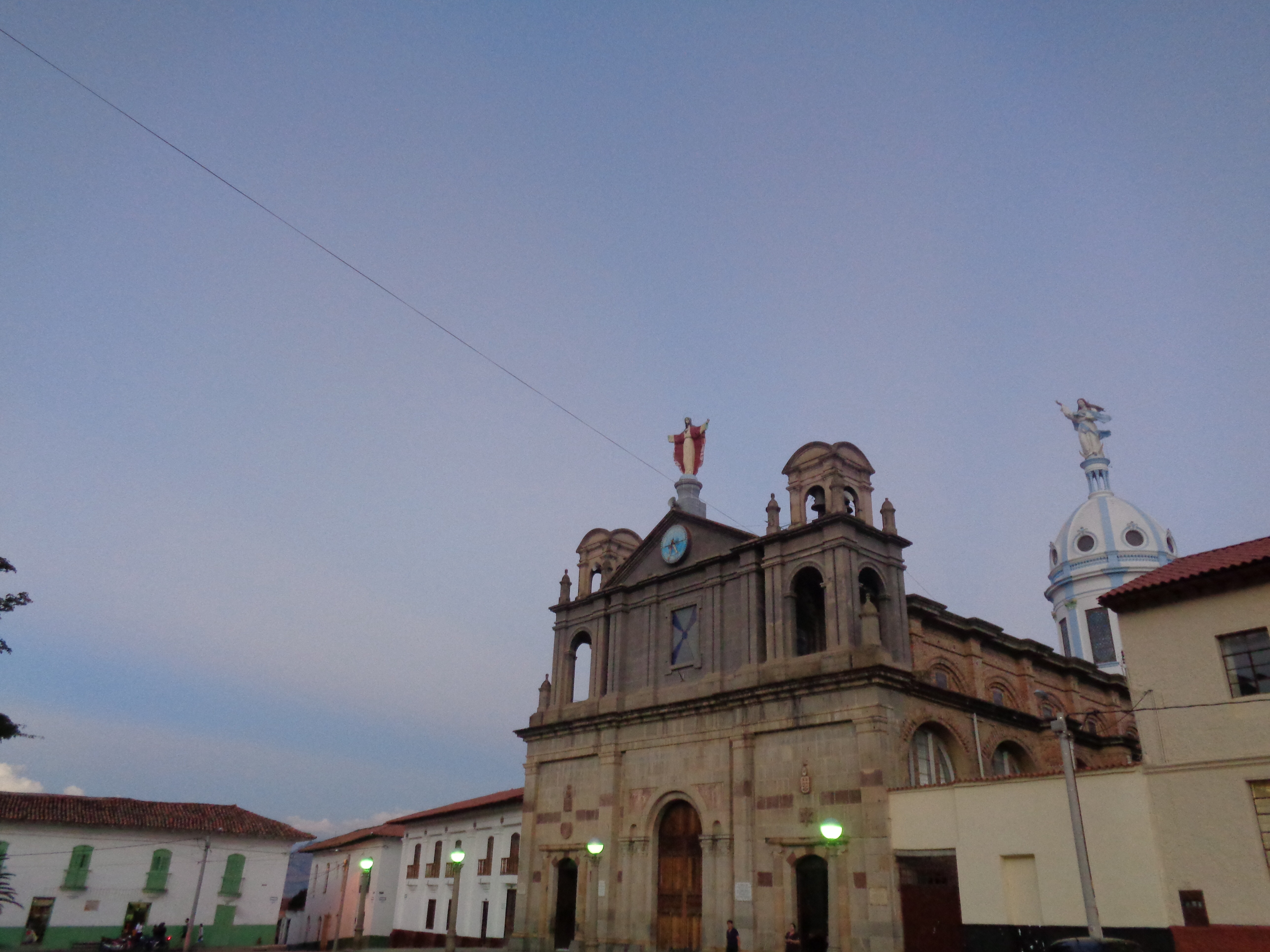
Cathedral

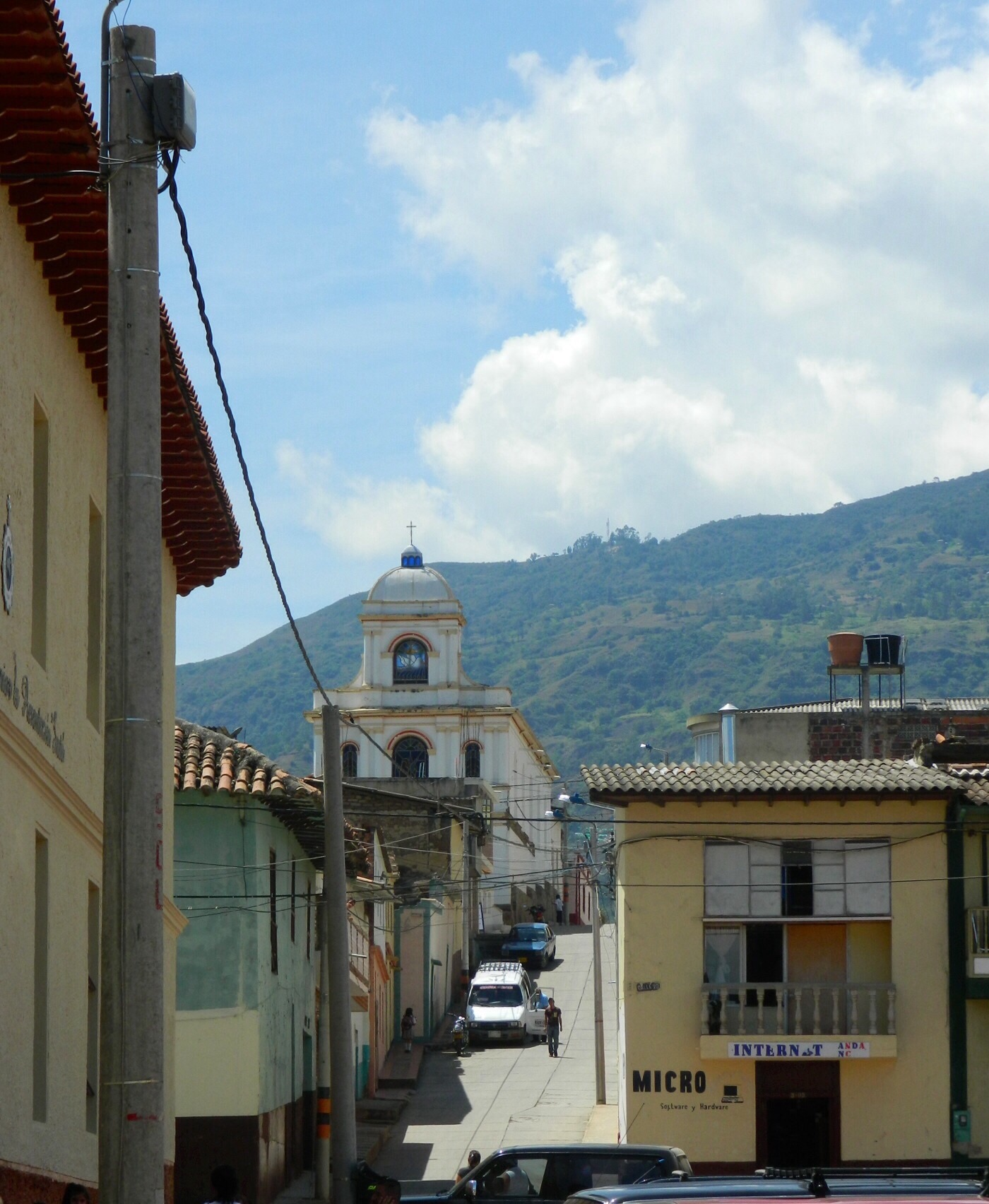
Chapel
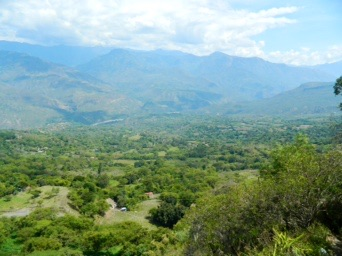
View of Chicamocha Canyon

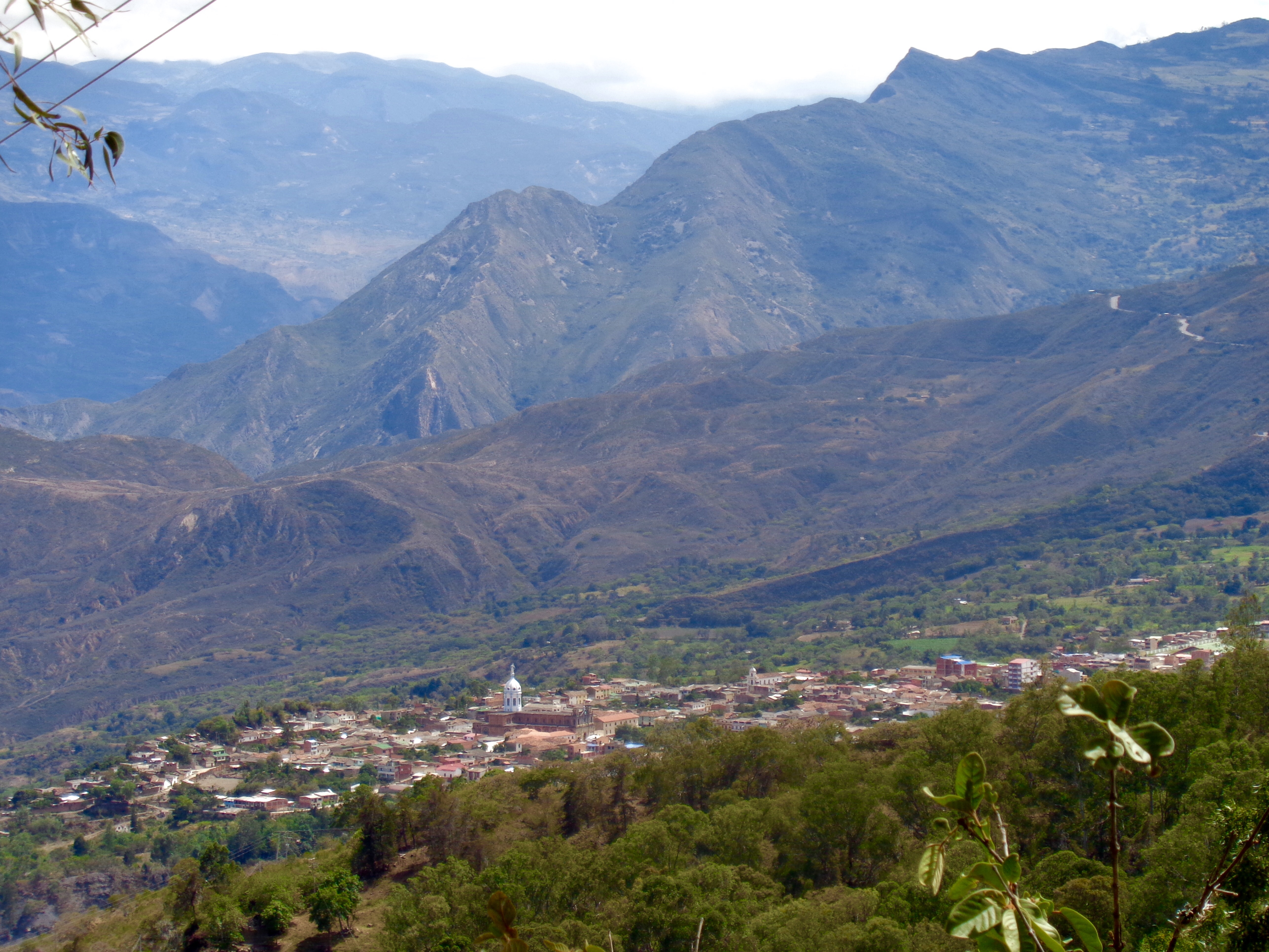
View of Soatá

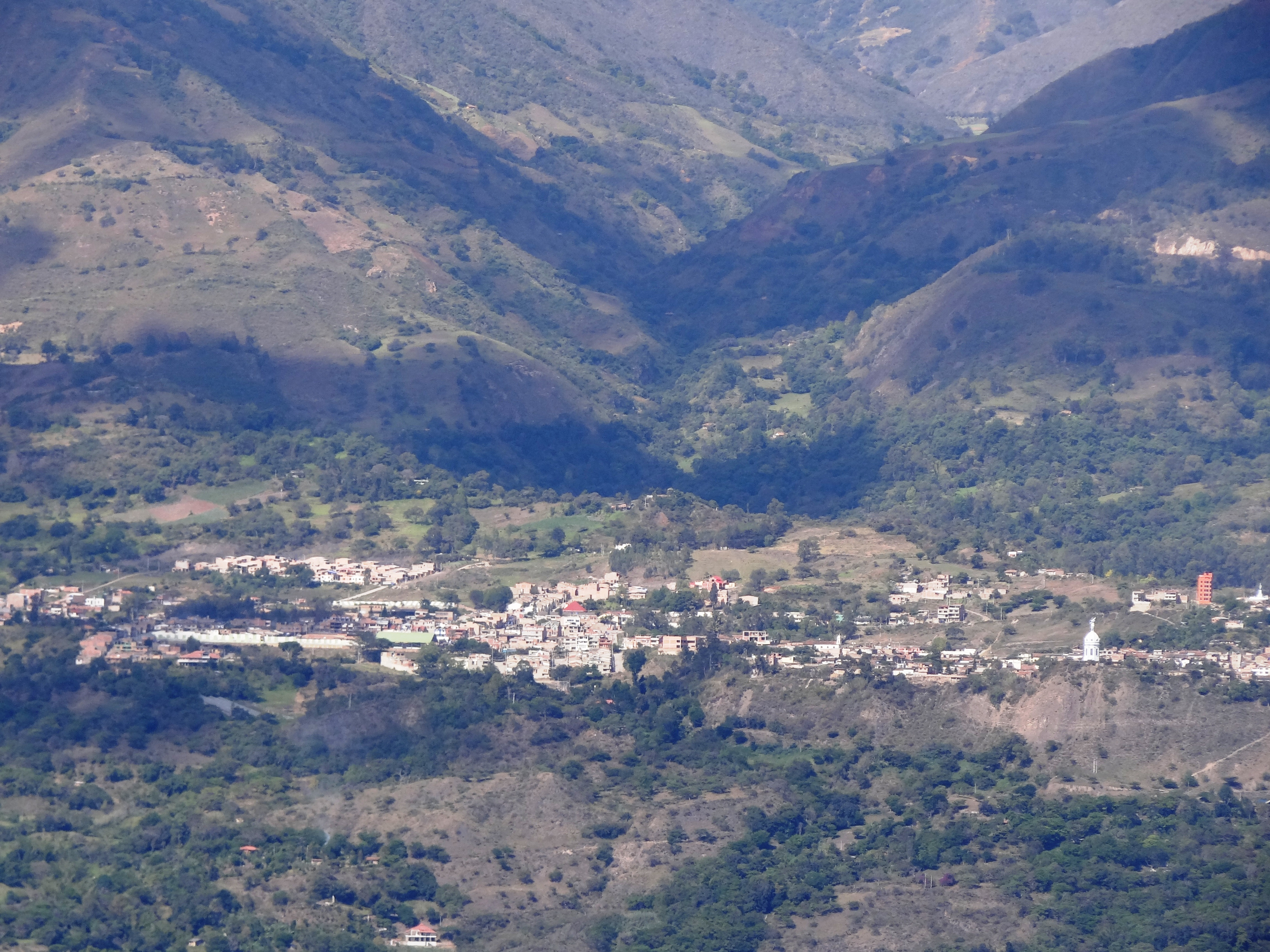
Soatá and surroundings

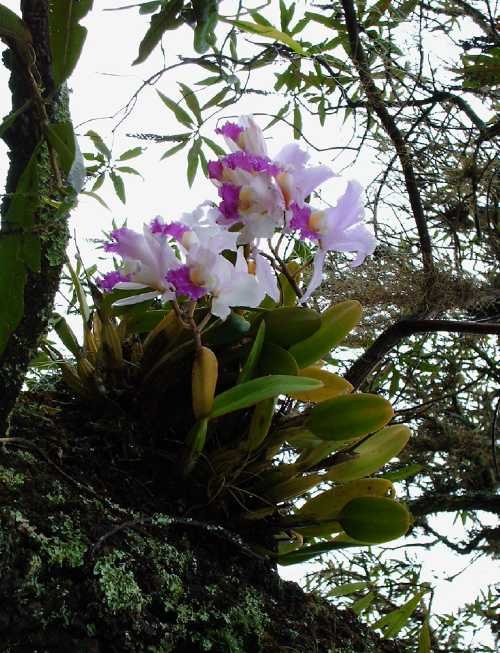
Orchid in Soatá
