= Tipacoque =

Coordinates: 6°25′N 72°42′W

- Municipality and town
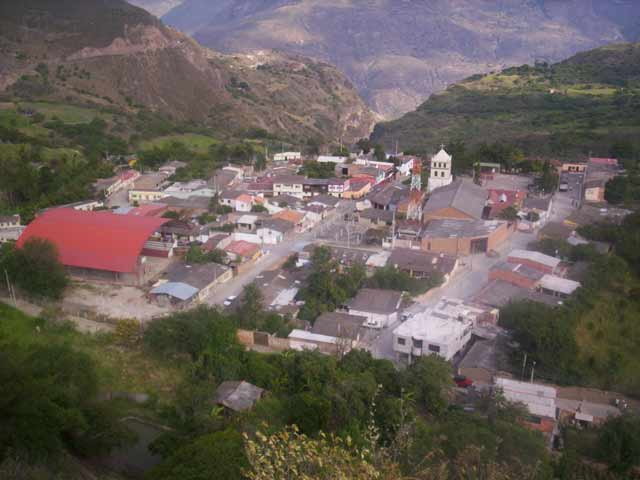
- View of Tipacoque

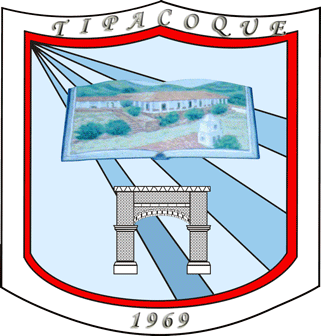
- Flag Coat of arms

- Location of the municipality and town of Tipacoque in the Boyacá Department of Colombia
- Country: Colombia
- Department: Boyacá Department
- Province: Northern Boyacá Province
- Founded: 28 November 1968
- Founder: Elvia Sandoval de Rojas

Government
  - Mayor: Carlos Nelson Díaz Pérez (2020-2023)

Area
  - Municipality and town: 72.067 km^{2} (27.825 sq mi)
- Elevation: 1,850 m (6,070 ft)

Population (2015)
  - Municipality and town: 3,206
  - Urban: 867
- Time zone: UTC-5 (Colombia Standard Time)
- Website: Official website

Tipacoque is a municipality and town in Boyacá Department, Colombia, located on the Altiplano Cundiboyacense, part of the Eastern Ranges of the Colombian Andes. Tipacoque is situated on the western flank of the Chicamocha river canyon. It is part of the Northern Boyacá Province.

== Etymology ==
Tipacoque is derived from Zipacoque, which in Chibcha means "dependency of the zaque", referring to the zaque rule of the village in the times of the Muisca Confederation, the loose confederation of rulers of the Muisca.

== Geography and climate ==
The total area of the municipality is 72 km^{2}. To the north it borders Covarachía and Capitanejo and to the south it borders Soatá. The Chicamocha River separates it from Capitanejo and Boavita in the east. Finally, a branch of the Eastern mountain range separates it from Onzaga (in Santander) in the west. This range varies from 1,200 meters at the base of the Chicamocha Canyon to over 3,000 meters at "Cruz de Roble".

The municipality is located at an altitude of 1,850 metres (6,070 ft) above sea level. Its average temperature is 18 °C (64.4 °F). The warmest months are December and January, when the temperature exceeds 25 °C. The climate is predominantly dry.

The vegetation is varied. The fauna is composed mainly by mammal species like rabbits, armadillos and tinajos, which live in the higher altitudes. In the lowlands, reptiles predominate. The most common birds are garrapateros, hummingbirds, toches, turpiales, gurrias, doves, perdices, pregoneros and cuchicas, native species that can be found in the creeks which feed the Chicamocha river.

Tripacoque is located 174 kilometres (108 mi) from Tunja, the capital of Boyacá. The main highway which connects Tipacoque with Bogotá and the east of Colombia is 174 km long, of which 150 km are paved (87%).

== Trivia ==
- The novel Tipacoque: Estampas de provincia (1971) by Eduardo Caballero Calderón describes the Colombian society in this region of Boyacá

== Gallery ==
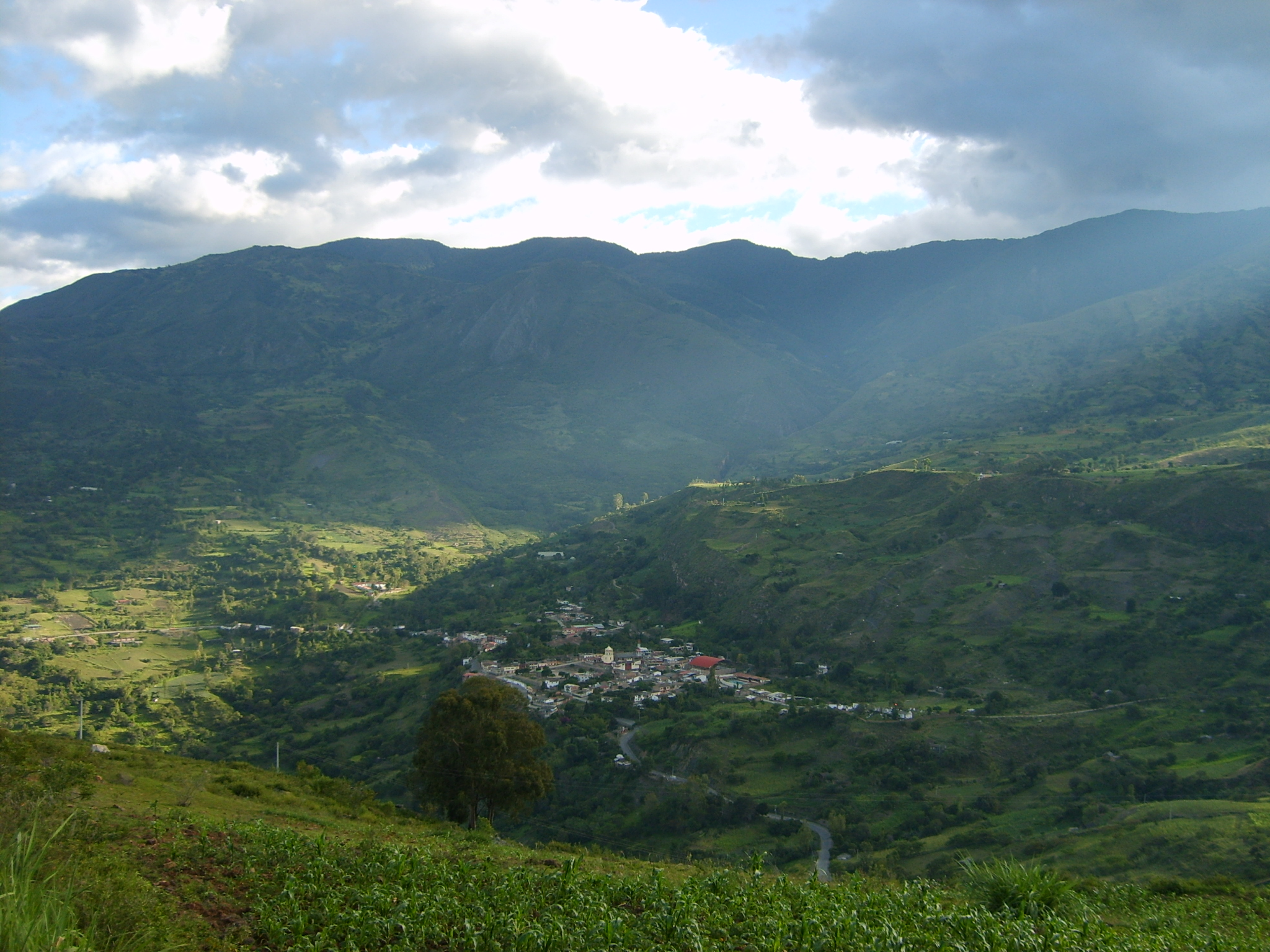
View of Tipacoque

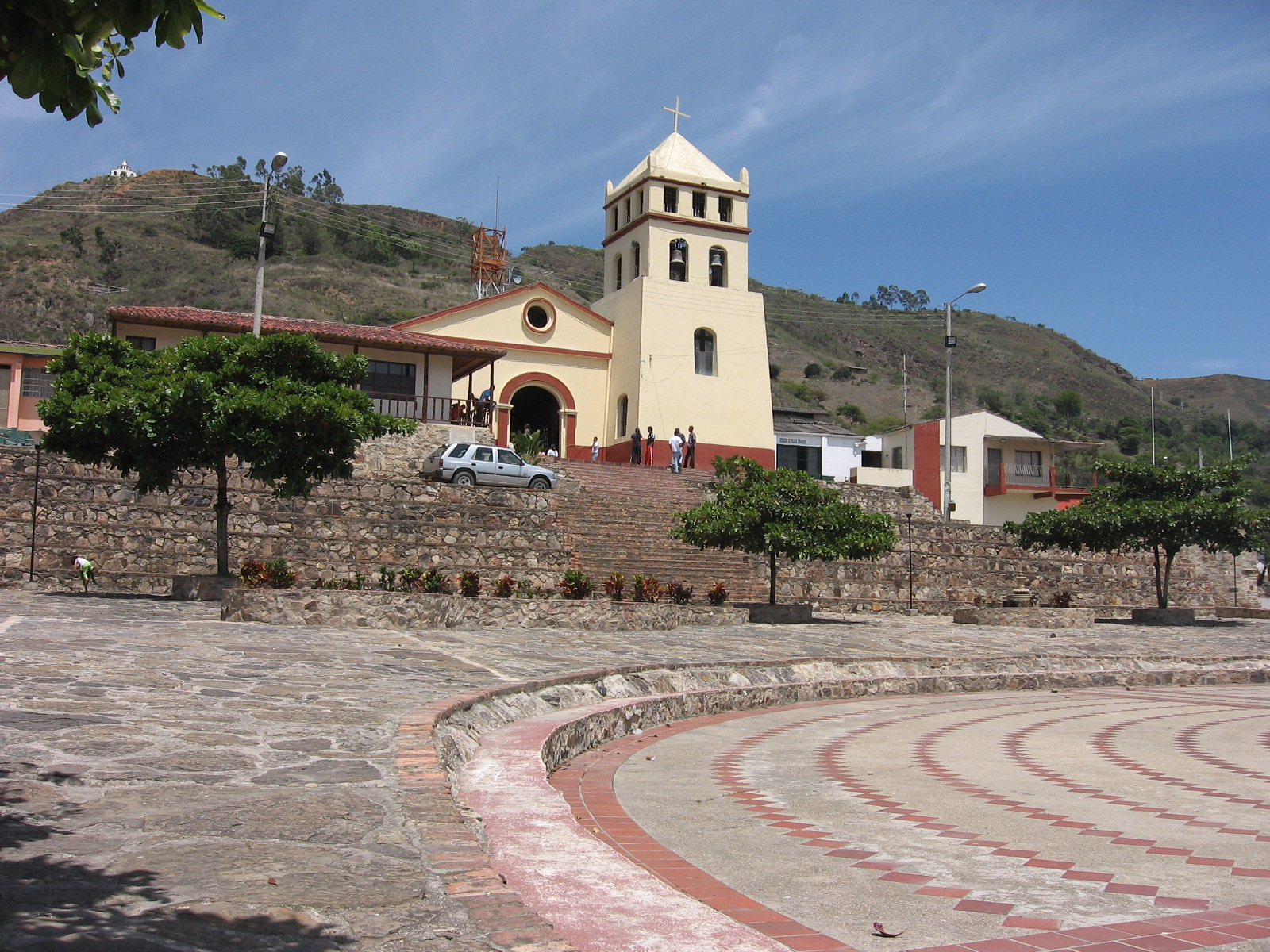
Central square and church

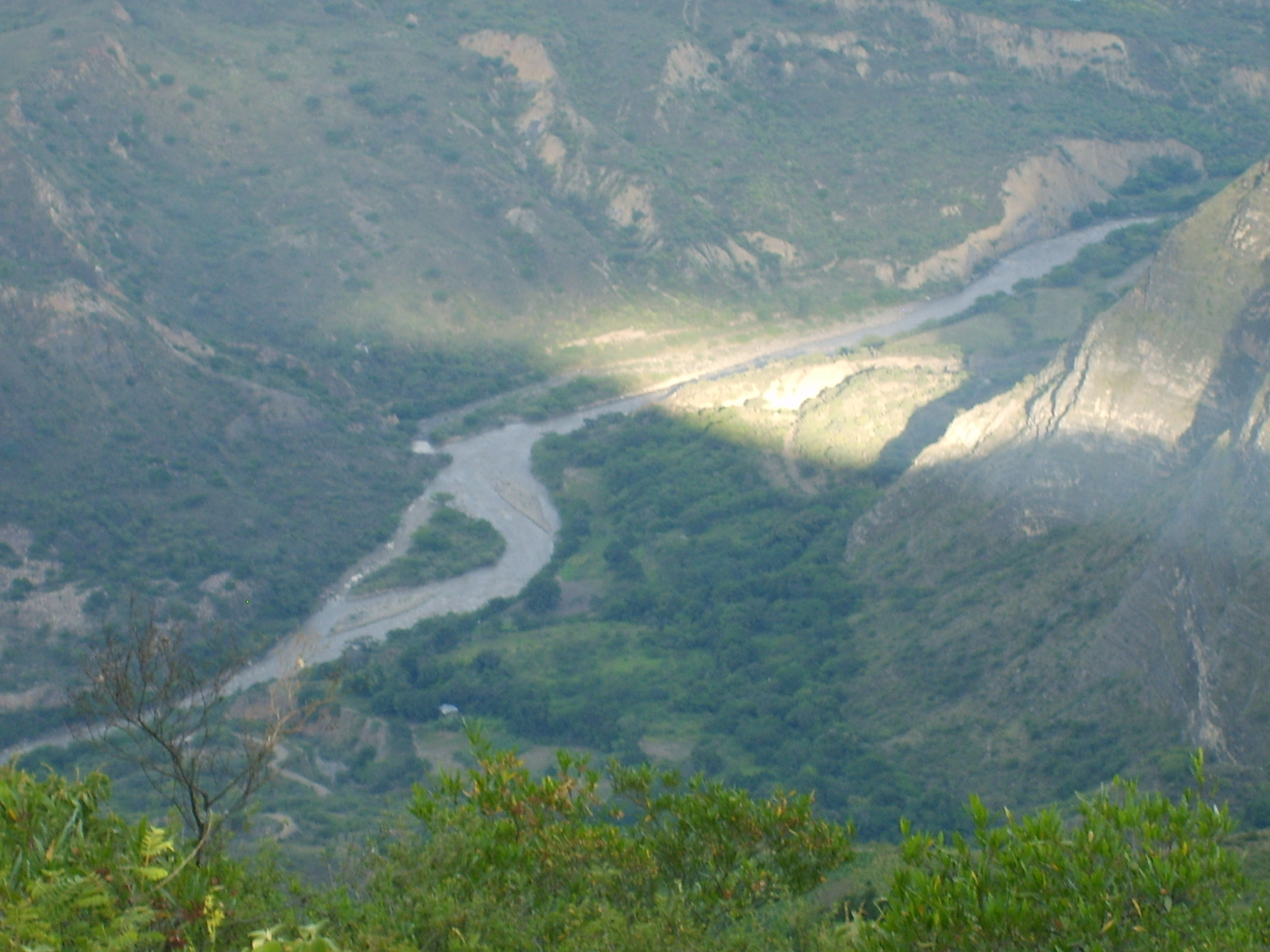
Chicamocha River Canyon
