= Onzaga =

Coordinates: 6°21′N 72°49′W

- Municipality and town
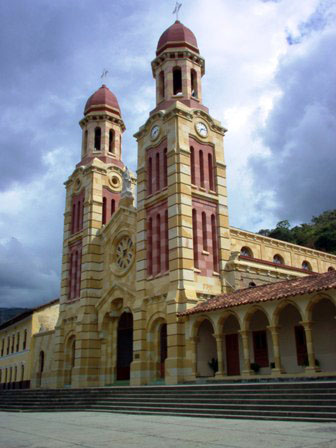
- Church of Onzaga

- Flag Seal

- Location of the municipality and town of Onzaga in the Santander Department of Colombia.
- Country: Colombia
- Department: Santander Department
- Province: Guanentá
- Founded: 31 March 1602

Government
  - Mayor: Hernán Eduardo Sanabria Aponte (2016-2019)

Area
  - Municipality and town: 486.76 km^{2} (187.94 sq mi)
  - Urban: 0.4031 km^{2} (0.1556 sq mi)
- Elevation: 1,960 m (6,430 ft)

Population (2015)
  - Municipality and town: 5,054
  - Density: 10.38/km^{2} (26.89/sq mi)
  - Urban: 1,229
- Time zone: UTC-5 (Colombia Standard Time)
- Website: Official website

Onzaga (Spanish pronunciation: [onˈsaɣa]) is a town and municipality in the Santander Department in northeastern Colombia. Onzaga borders in the north San Joaquín, in the east and south the municipalities Soatá, Covarachía, Tipacoque and Tutazá of the department of Boyacá and in the west with Coromoro. Onzaga is 177 kilometres (110 mi) south of the department capital Bucaramanga. The topography of Onzaga varies greatly; from 900 metres (3,000 ft) to 3,600 metres (11,800 ft).

== History ==
The area around Onzaga was inhabited by the Muisca and Onzaga was the northernmost village of their Muisca Confederation. To the north and west the Guanes populated the lower lands. When the Spanish conquistadores arrived in the central highlands of Colombia, they found indigenous peoples expert in gold working and crafts. Onzaga was famous for its wool and cotton production as well as the elaboration of the mantles.

Onzaga was ruled by the cacique of Duitama, called Tundama. The name is possibly derived from a cacique of Onzaga who was called Hunzaá (not to be confused with Hunzahúa, the first zaque of Hunza (now called Tunja)).

Modern Onzaga was founded on March 31, 1602.

== Economy ==
Main economical activities of Onzaga are the production of textile, shoes, liquor and agriculture (coffee, fique, maize, beans, sugar cane and yuca). Other primary industry are livestock farming and poultry farming.
