= San Joaquín, Santander =

- Municipality and town
- Flag

- Location of the municipality and town of San Joaquín, Santander in the Santander Department of Colombia.
- Country: Colombia
- Department: Santander Department
- Time zone: UTC-5 (Colombia Standard Time)

San Joaquín is a town and municipality in the Santander Department in northeastern Colombia. It covers an area of 143.1 square kilometers, at an average elevation of 2,000 meters above the sea level. In the year 2018, it had a population of 2,241.
