= Gachalá =

- Municipality and town
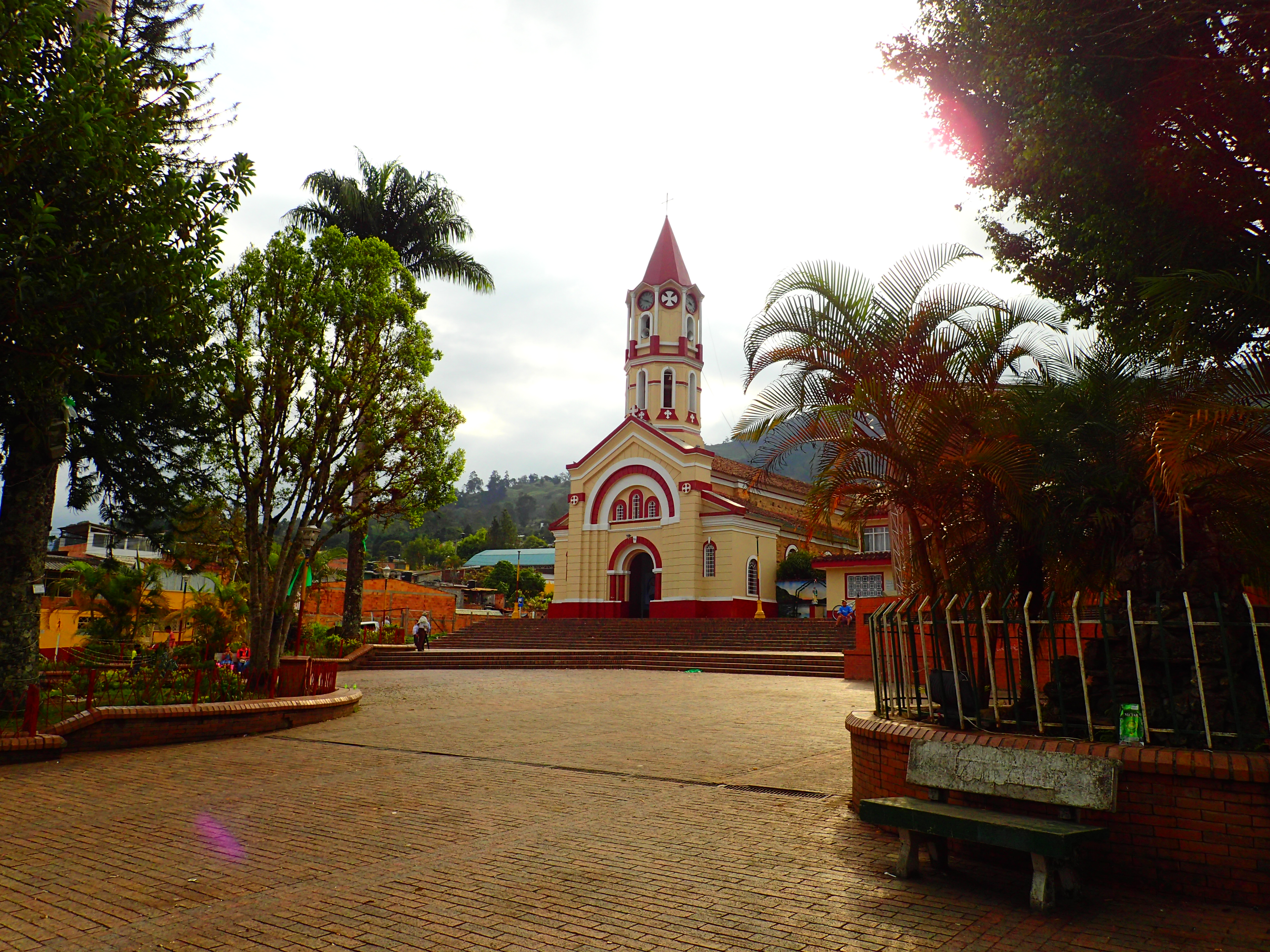
- Central square and church of Gachalá

- Flag Coat of arms

- Location of the municipality and town of Gachalá inside Cundinamarca Department of Colombia

- Location in Colombia
- Coordinates: 4°41′35″N 73°31′12″W
- Country: Colombia
- Department: Cundinamarca
- Province: Guavio Province
- Founded: 22 February 1810
- Founder: Mariano de Mendoza y Bueno

Government
  - Mayor: Germán Martínez Beltrán (2016-2019)

Area
  - Municipality and town: 448.29 km^{2} (173.09 sq mi)
- Elevation: 1,712 m (5,617 ft)

Population (2015)
  - Municipality and town: 5,715
  - Density: 12.75/km^{2} (33.02/sq mi)
  - Urban: 2,025
- Time zone: UTC-5 (Colombia Standard Time)
- Website: Official website

Gachalá is a municipality and town of Colombia in the Guavio Province, part of the department of Cundinamarca. The urban centre of Gachalá is situated at a distance of 148 kilometres (92 mi) from the capital Bogotá at an altitude of 1,712 metres (5,617 ft) in the Eastern Ranges of the Colombian Andes. The municipality borders the western portion of the split municipality Ubalá and the department of Boyacá in the north, the eastern part of Ubalá and Medina in the east, Fómeque, Junín and Gama in the west and Fómeque, Medina and the department of Meta in the south.

== Etymology ==
The name of Gachalá is derived from Chibcha and means "clay vessel of the night" or "defeat of the night".

== History ==
Before the Spanish conquest of the Muisca, Gachalá was inhabited by the Chío tribe, belonging to the Muisca. As of 1548, the terrain of Gachalá belonged to the cacique of Guatavita.

Modern Gachalá was founded on February 22, 1810, by Mariano de Mendoza y Bueno.

== Economy ==
The main economical activity in Gachalá is the hydroelectric plant of the Guavio Reservoir. Emerald mining is also an important source of income. The 858 carats (171.6 g) Gachalá Emerald was found in and named after Gachalá.

== Born in Gachalá ==
- Gonzalo Correal Urrego, anthropologist and archaeologist

== Gallery ==
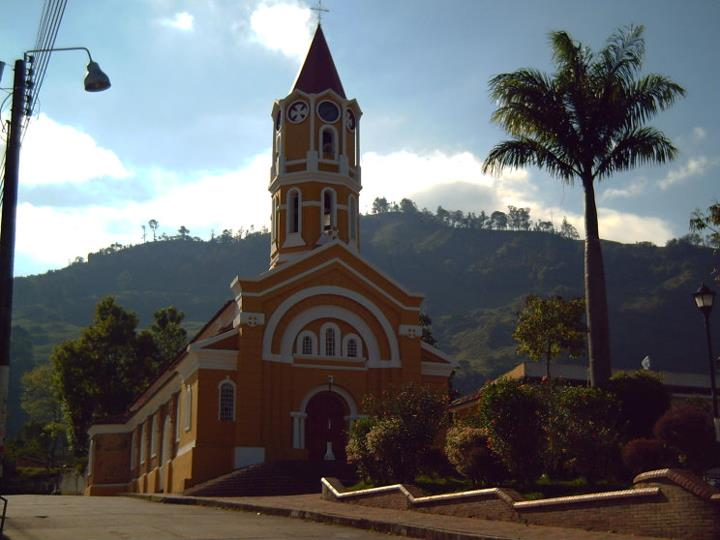
Church of Gachalá

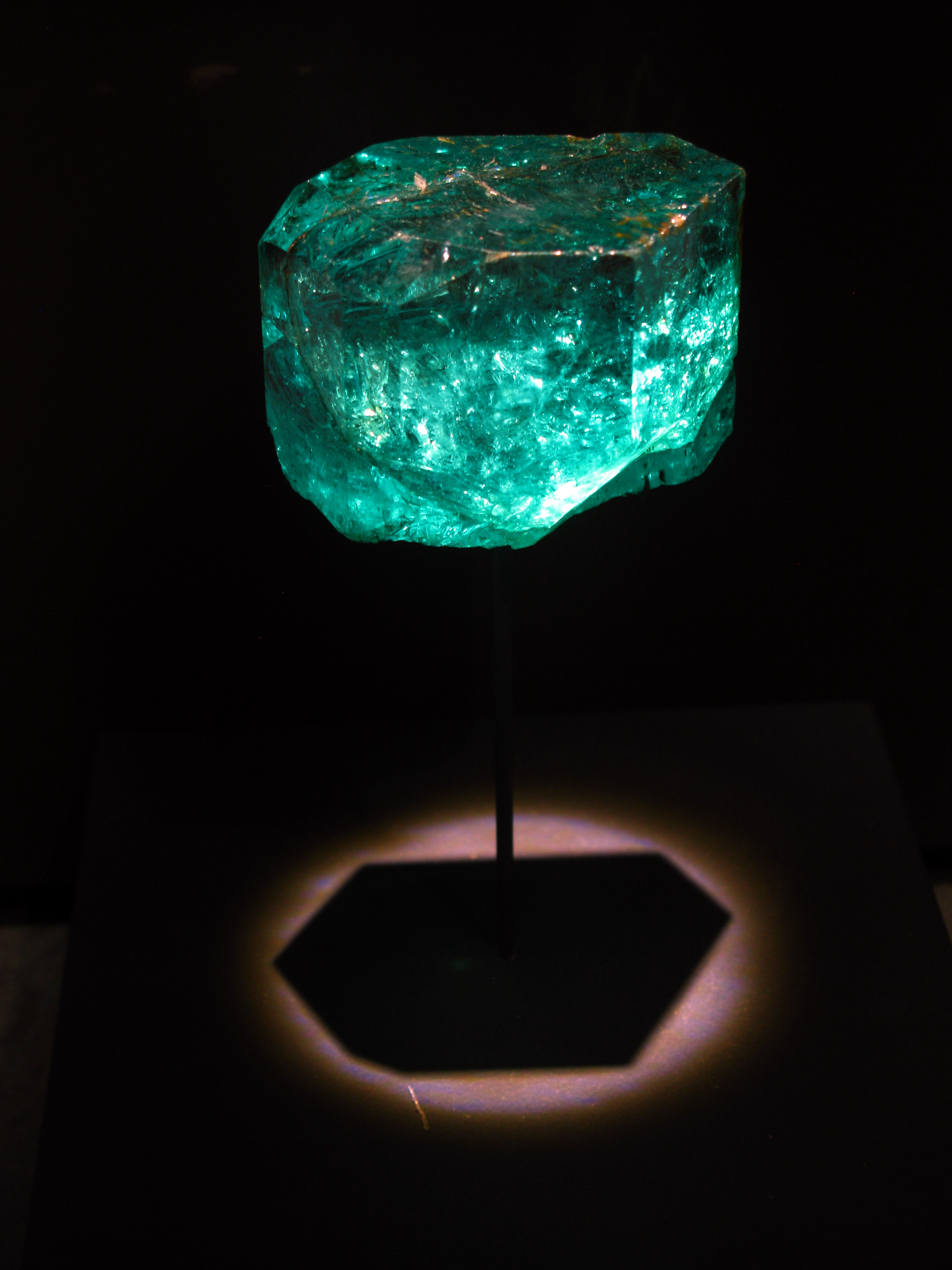
Gachalá Emerald
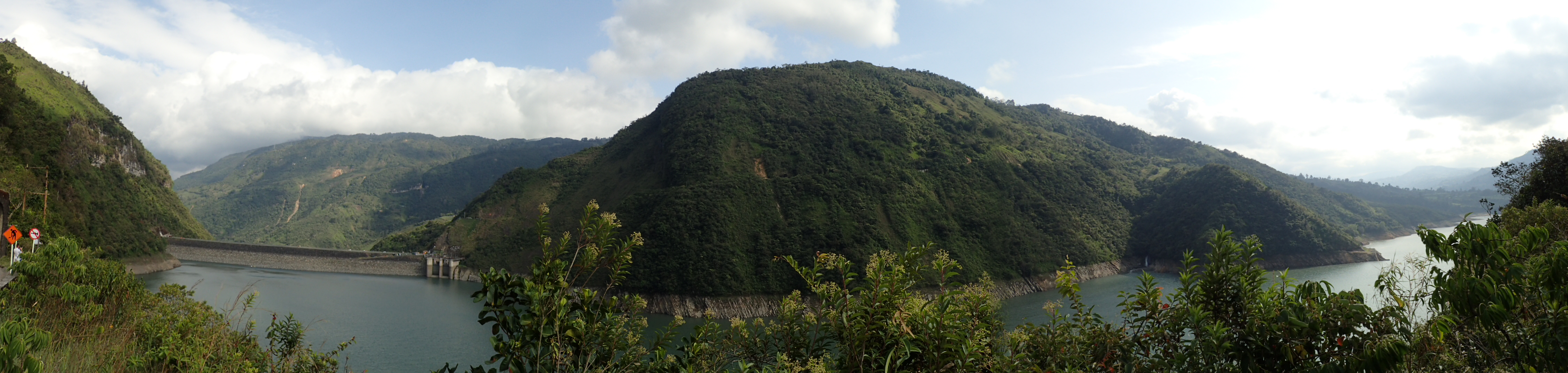
View of the Guavio Reservoir
