= Gama, Cundinamarca =

Gama
- Municipality and town
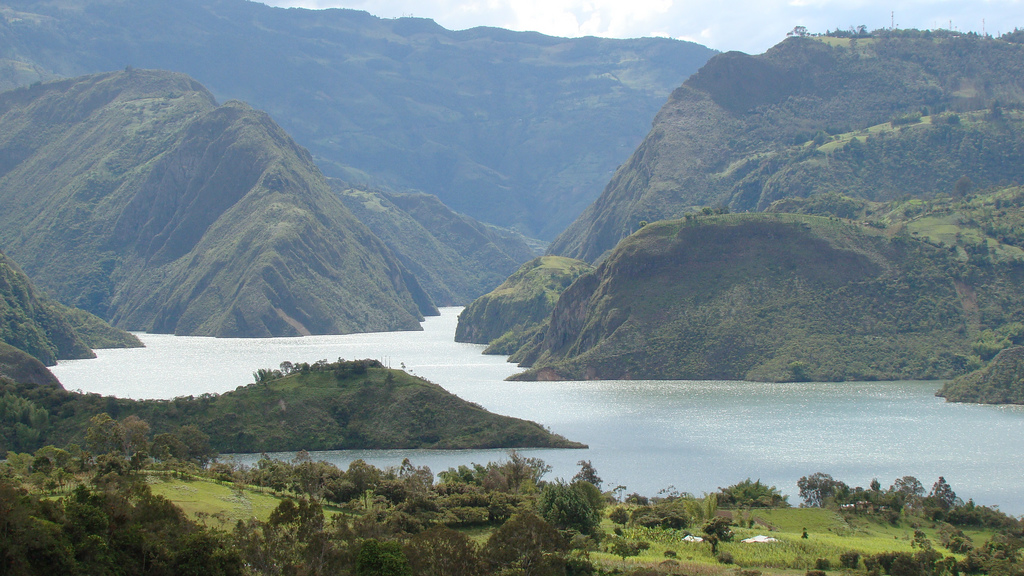
- Gama borders the Guavio Reservoir

- Flag Coat of arms

- Location of the municipality and town of Gama in the Cundinamarca Department of Colombia

- Location in Colombia
- Coordinates: 4°45′46″N 73°36′39″W
- Country: Colombia
- Department: Cundinamarca
- Province: Guavio Province
- Founded: 8 May 1903
- Founder: Juan Martín Romero

Government
  - Mayor: Ernesto Avelino Ruiz

Area
  - Municipality and town: 108 km^{2} (42 sq mi)
  - Urban: 15 km^{2} (5.8 sq mi)
- Elevation: 2,180 m (7,150 ft)

Population (2015)
  - Municipality and town: 3,996
  - Density: 37.0/km^{2} (95.8/sq mi)
  - Urban: 841
- Time zone: UTC-5 (Colombia Standard Time)
- Website: Official website

Gama is a municipality and town of Colombia in the Guavio Province, part of the department of Cundinamarca. The urban centre of Gama is situated at an altitude of 2,180 metres (7,150 ft) in the Eastern Ranges of the Colombian Andes. Gama, at 118 kilometres (73 mi) from the capital Bogotá, borders Gachetá in the north, Junín and Gachalá in the south, Ubalá in the east and Junín in the west.

== Etymology ==
Gama is derived either from Muysccubun meaning "our back", or from the language of the local Chío tribe; "behind the licked hill", referring to the lake of Guatavita behind the mountains to the northwest.

== History ==
Before the Spanish conquest of the Muisca, Gama was inhabited by a tribe called the Chío. The first registration of the village was made in 1846, when the church in Ubalá was constructed. Gama was properly founded not earlier than 1903, by Juan Martín Romero.

== Economy ==
Main economical activity in Gama is agriculture, with predominantly potatoes, beans, peas and maize cultivated. Other products include yuca, bananas, pineapples and coffee.
