= Gachetá =

Gachetá, Cundinamarca
- Municipality and town
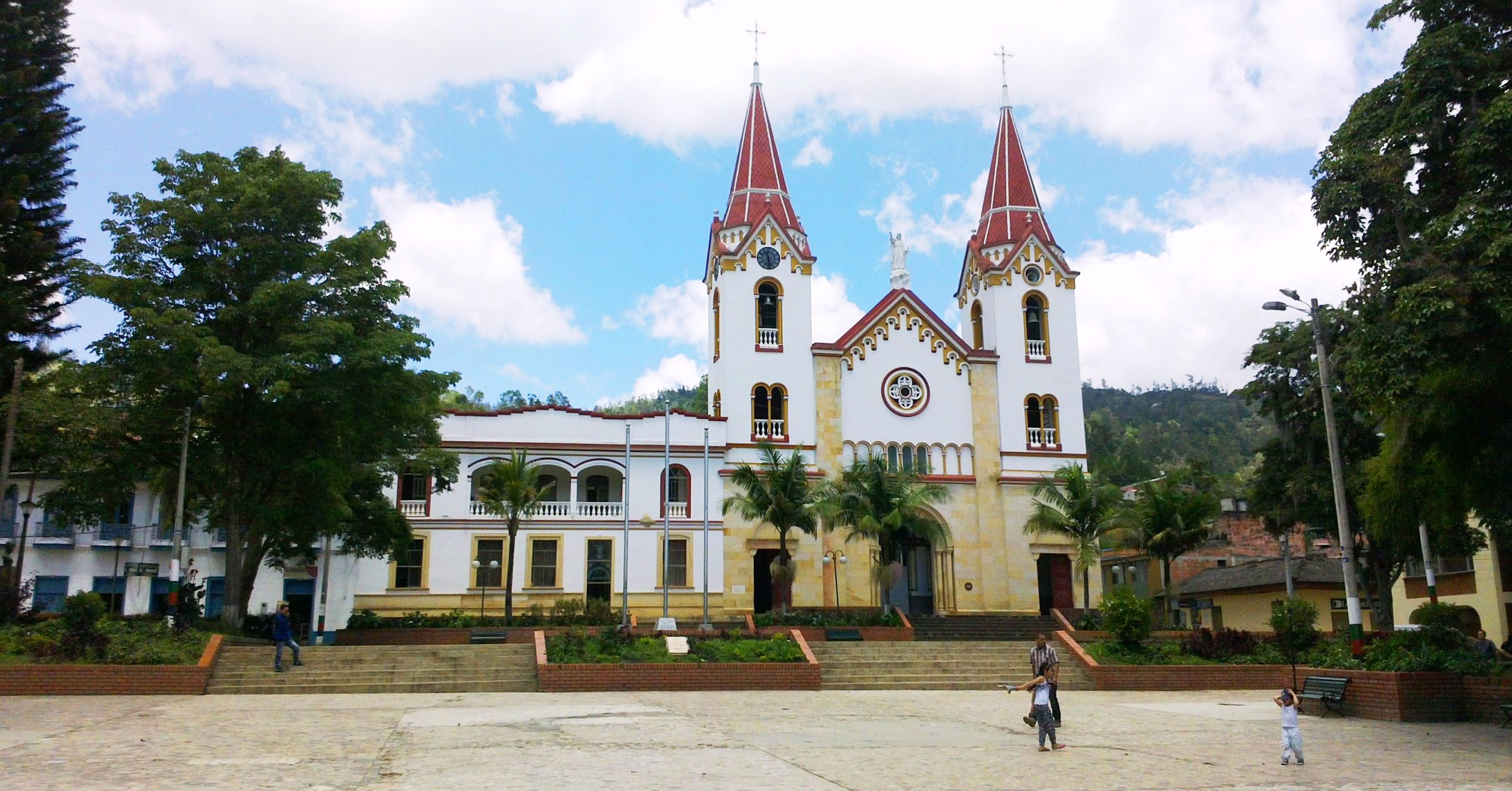
- Church of Gachetá

- Flag Coat of arms
- Etymology: Muysccubun: "Behind our farmfields"
- Location of the municipality and town of Gachetá in the Boyacá Department of Colombia

- Location in Colombia
- Coordinates: 4°49′03.2″N 73°38′09.7″W
- Country: Colombia
- Department: Cundinamarca
- Province: Guavio Province
- Founded: 2 April 1593
- Founder: Miguel de Ibarra

Government
  - Mayor: Julio Enrique Aguilera Jiménez (2016–2019)

Area
  - Municipality and town: 262.16 km^{2} (101.22 sq mi)
  - Urban: 0.96 km^{2} (0.37 sq mi)
- Elevation: 1,745 m (5,725 ft)

Population (2015)
  - Municipality and town: 11,086
  - Density: 42.287/km^{2} (109.52/sq mi)
  - Urban: 3,689
- Time zone: UTC-5 (Colombia Standard Time)
- Website: Official website

Gachetá, Cundinamarca is a municipality and town of Colombia, capital of the Guavio Province, part of the department of Cundinamarca. The urban centre of Gachetá is situated at an altitude of 1,745 metres (5,725 ft) in the Eastern Ranges of the Colombian Andes. The municipality borders Machetá and Manta in the north, the department of Boyacá and Ubalá in the east, Gama and Junín in the south and Guatavita in the west.

== Etymology ==
The name Gachetá comes from Muysccubun and means "behind our farmfields".

== History ==
Gachetá before the Spanish conquest was inhabited by the Muisca, organised in their loose Muisca Confederation. Gachetá was part of the domains of the cacique of Guatavita.

Modern Gachetá was founded on April 2, 1593, by Miguel de Ibarra.

== Economy ==
Main economical activity of Gachetá is agriculture, with main products coffee, maize, yuca, arracacha, potatoes, beans, sugarcane and blackberries cultivated.

== Climate ==
Climate data for Gachetá, elevation 1,752 m (5,748 ft), (1981–2010)
| Month | Jan | Feb | Mar | Apr | May | Jun | Jul | Aug | Sep | Oct | Nov | Dec | Year |
|---|---|---|---|---|---|---|---|---|---|---|---|---|---|
| Mean daily maximum °C (°F) | 25.2 (77.4) | 25.5 (77.9) | 24.9 (76.8) | 24.1 (75.4) | 23.7 (74.7) | 22.8 (73.0) | 22.3 (72.1) | 22.9 (73.2) | 23.8 (74.8) | 24.3 (75.7) | 24.6 (76.3) | 24.8 (76.6) | 24.1 (75.4) |
| Daily mean °C (°F) | 19.1 (66.4) | 19.5 (67.1) | 19.6 (67.3) | 19.5 (67.1) | 19.3 (66.7) | 18.7 (65.7) | 18.2 (64.8) | 18.5 (65.3) | 18.8 (65.8) | 19.3 (66.7) | 19.3 (66.7) | 19.1 (66.4) | 19.1 (66.4) |
| Mean daily minimum °C (°F) | 11.7 (53.1) | 12.8 (55.0) | 13.9 (57.0) | 14.6 (58.3) | 14.8 (58.6) | 14.5 (58.1) | 14.0 (57.2) | 14.0 (57.2) | 13.4 (56.1) | 13.8 (56.8) | 13.8 (56.8) | 12.4 (54.3) | 13.7 (56.7) |
| Average precipitation mm (inches) | 28.6 (1.13) | 48.4 (1.91) | 73.6 (2.90) | 134.9 (5.31) | 165.9 (6.53) | 154.0 (6.06) | 152.2 (5.99) | 117.4 (4.62) | 95.3 (3.75) | 113.9 (4.48) | 97.6 (3.84) | 45.1 (1.78) | 1,227 (48.3) |
| Average precipitation days | 7 | 10 | 15 | 21 | 24 | 25 | 25 | 23 | 19 | 19 | 17 | 12 | 212 |
| Average relative humidity (%) | 68 | 69 | 71 | 75 | 76 | 77 | 77 | 76 | 74 | 73 | 74 | 71 | 73 |
| Mean monthly sunshine hours | 186.0 | 144.0 | 117.8 | 87.0 | 89.9 | 78.0 | 86.8 | 93.0 | 108.0 | 117.8 | 126.0 | 148.8 | 1,383.1 |
| Mean daily sunshine hours | 6.0 | 5.1 | 3.8 | 2.9 | 2.9 | 2.6 | 2.8 | 3.0 | 3.6 | 3.8 | 4.2 | 4.8 | 3.8 |
Source: Instituto de Hidrologia Meteorologia y Estudios Ambientales

== Gallery ==
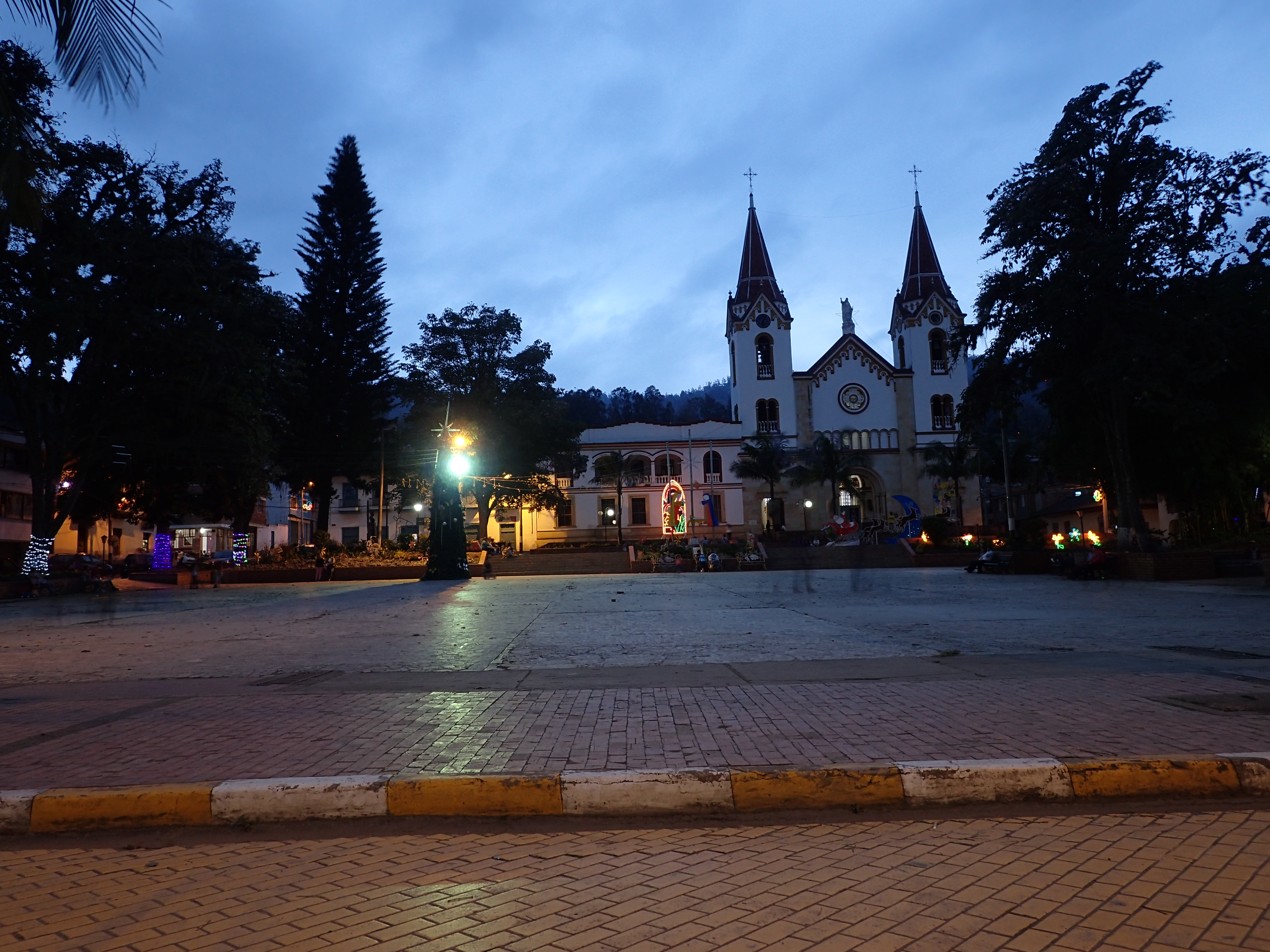
Central square

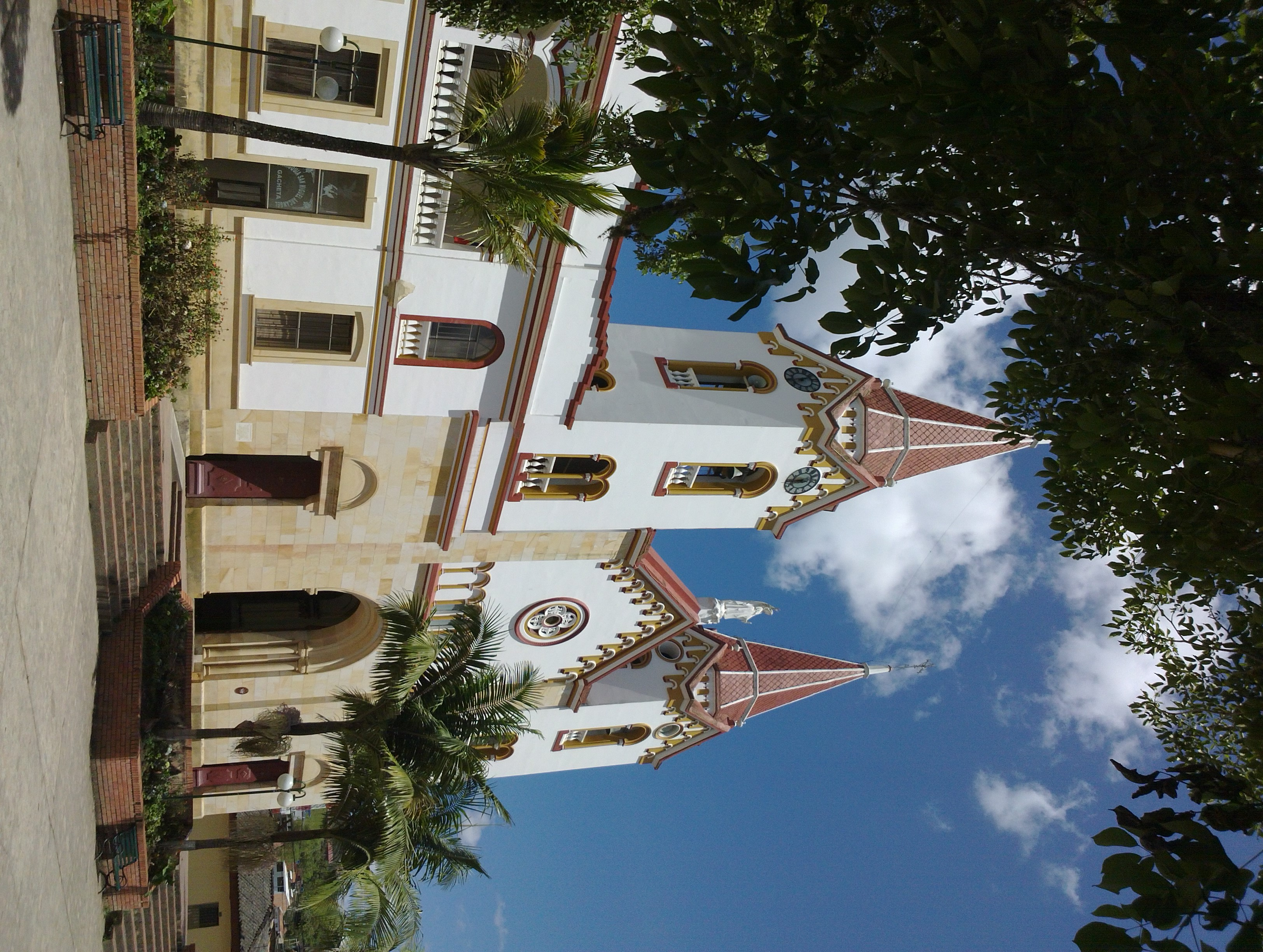
Church

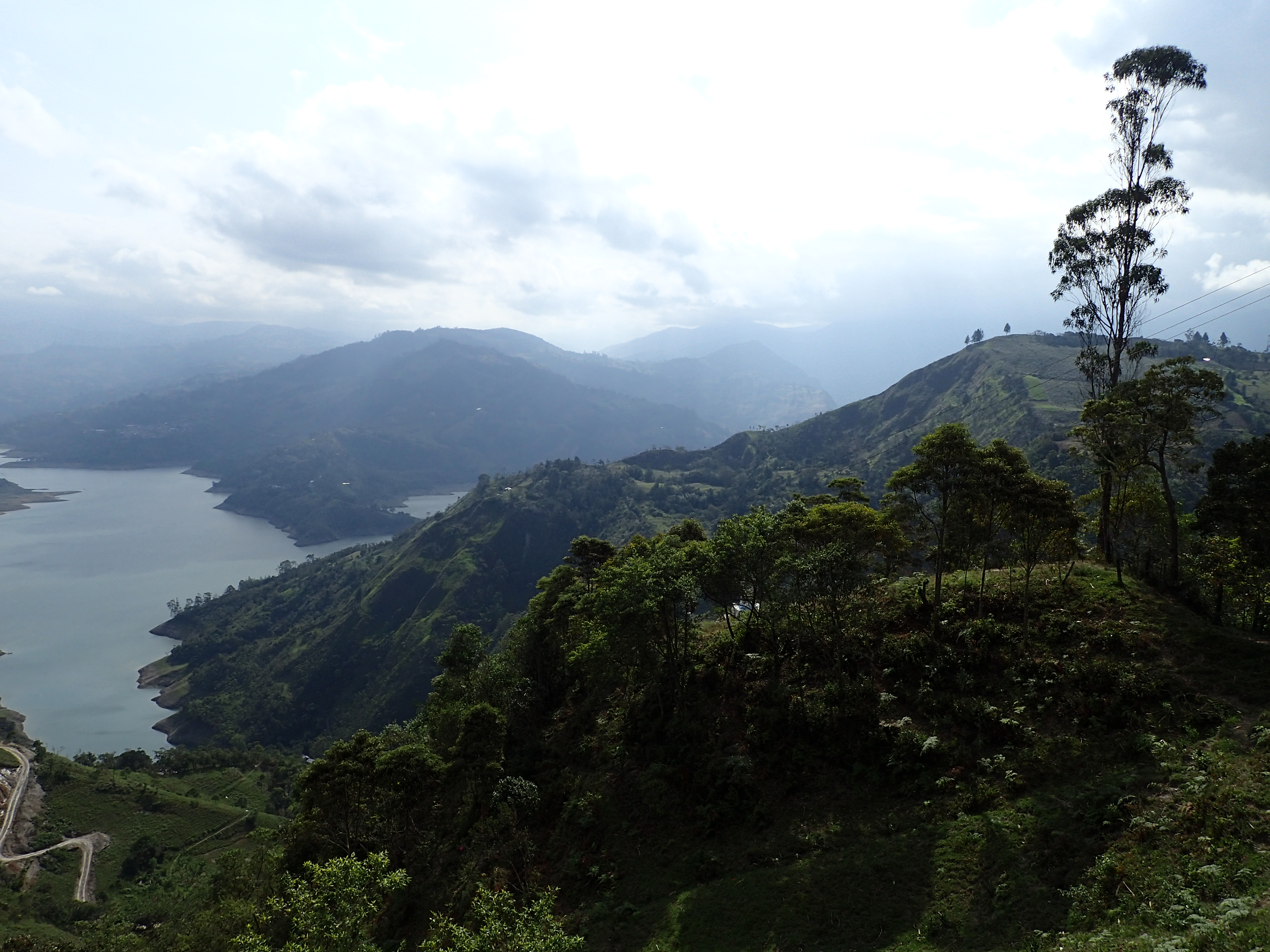
Guavio Reservoir
