= Guavio Province =

Guavio Province Provincia del Guavio
- Province
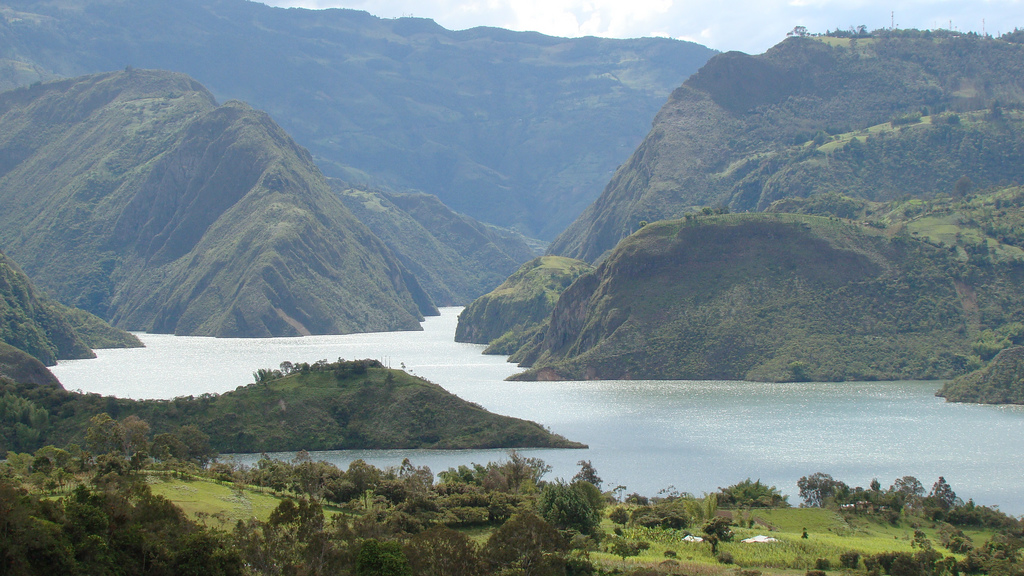
- Guavio Reservoir
- Etymology: Guavio River
- Location of Guavio Province in Colombia
- Coordinates: 4°18′59″N 73°38′10″W
- Country: Colombia
- Department: Cundinamarca
- Capital: Gachetá
- Municipalities: 8

Area
  - Total: 2,570.75 km^{2} (992.57 sq mi)

Population (2015)
  - Total: 89,309
  - Density: 34.740/km^{2} (89.977/sq mi)
- Time zone: UTC−05:00 (COT)
- Indigenous groups: Muisca

The Guavio Province (Spanish: Provincia del Guavio) is one of the 15 provinces in the Cundinamarca department, Colombia. Guavio borders the Capital District of Bogotá and the Central Savanna Province to the west, to the north the Almeidas Province, to the east the Boyacá Department and Medina Province and to the south the Meta Department and the Eastern Province. The Alberto Lleras Dam is also located in this area. The eastern municipalities Gachalá and Ubalá are rich in emeralds.

== Subdivision ==
Guavio Province is subdivided into 8 municipalities:

Municipality bold is capital	Area km^{2}	Elevation (m) urban centre	Population 2015	Founded	Map
La Calera	317	2718	27,527	1772	
Gachalá	448.29	1712	5715	1810	
Gachetá	262.16	1745	11,086	1593	
Gama	108	2180	3996	1903	
Guasca	346	2710	14,759	1600	
Guatavita	247.3	2680	6898	1593	
Junín	337	2300	8610	1550	
Ubalá	505	1949	10,718	1846	
Total	2570.75		89,309		
