= Medina Province =

Medina Province may refer to:

- Medina Province, Cundinamarca, Colombia
- Medina Province, Saudi Arabia
