= Medina Province, Cundinamarca =

Medina Province Provincia de Medina
- Province
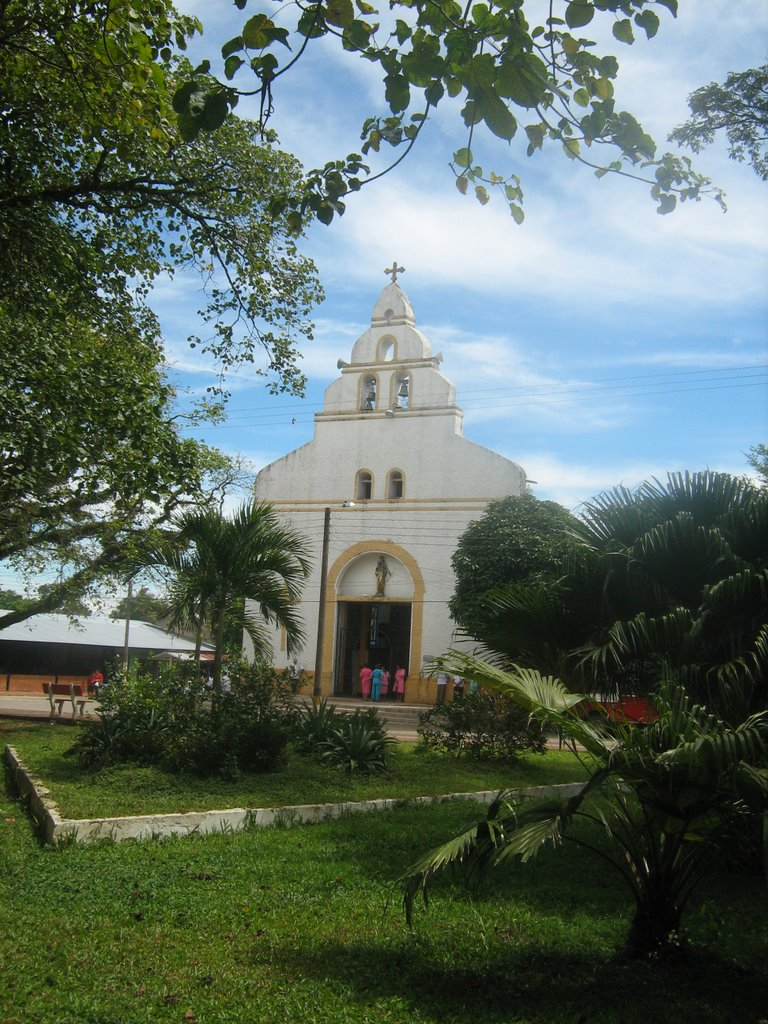
- Church of Medina
- Etymology: Medina
- Location of Medina Province in Colombia
- Coordinates: 4°30′33″N 73°20′58″W
- Country: Colombia
- Department: Cundinamarca
- Capital: Medina
- Municipalities: 2
- Time zone: UTC−05:00 (COT)
- Indigenous groups: Tegua

Medina Province (Spanish: Provincia de Medina) is one of the 15 provinces in the Cundinamarca Department, Colombia. Medina borders to the west the Guavio Province, to the north, northeast and east the Boyacá Department and to the southeast and south the Meta Department.

Medina contains two municipalities:

- Medina
- Paratebueno
