= Junín, Cundinamarca =

Junín (Nuestra Señora de la Concepción de) Chipazaque
- Municipality and town
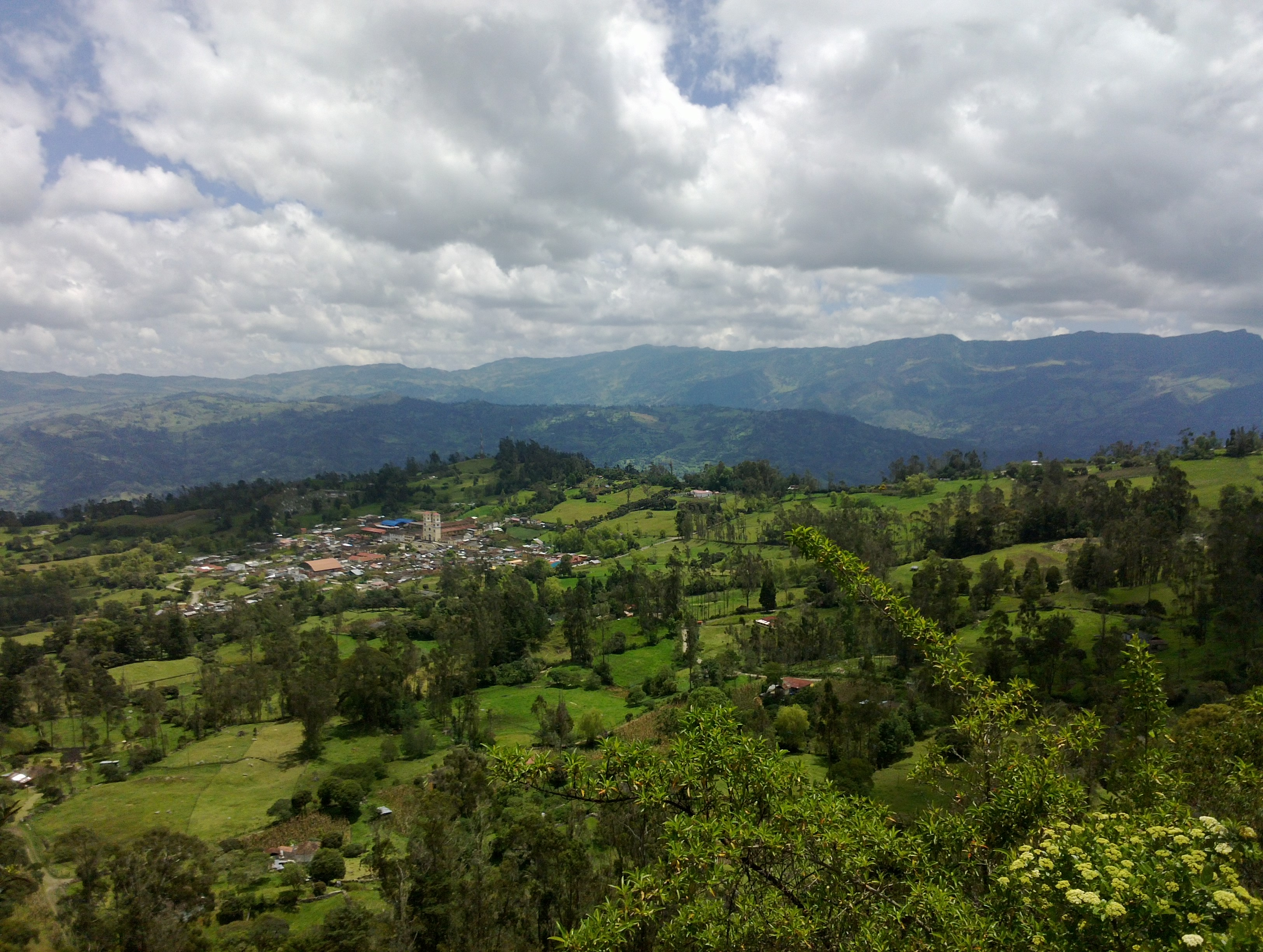
- View of Junín

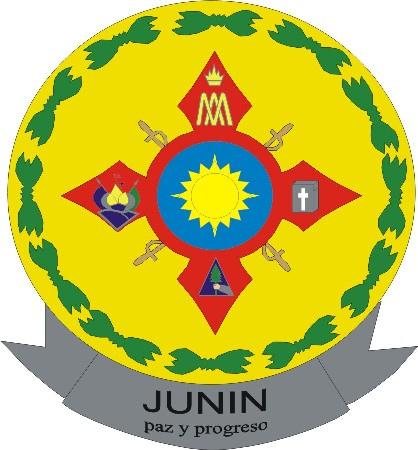
- Flag Seal

- Location of the municipality and town of Junín in the Cundinamarca Department of Colombia

- Location in Colombia
- Coordinates: 4°47′25″N 73°48′49″W
- Country: Colombia
- Department: Cundinamarca
- Province: Guavio Province
- Founded: 13 August 1550

Government
  - Mayor: María Elica Prieto Bustos (2016-2019)

Area
  - Municipality and town: 337 km^{2} (130 sq mi)
  - Urban: 2.97 km^{2} (1.15 sq mi)
- Elevation: 2,300 m (7,500 ft)

Population (2015)
  - Municipality and town: 8,610
  - Density: 25.5/km^{2} (66.2/sq mi)
  - Urban: 998
- Time zone: UTC-5 (Colombia Standard Time)
- Website: Official website

Junín is a municipality and town of Colombia in the Guavio Province, part of the department of Cundinamarca. The urban centre is situated at an altitude of 2,300 metres (7,500 ft) in the east of the Altiplano Cundiboyacense. Junín borders Gachetá and Guatavita in the north, Gama and Gachalá in the east, Fómeque in the south, and La Calera and Guasca in the west.

== Etymology ==
The former name Chipazaque of Junín refers to the shared terrain by the zipa and zaque, the most important caciques of the Muisca Confederation. In Muysccubun it means "our father the zaque" or "union between zipa and zaque". The name Junín was given by Tomas Cipriano de Mosquera in 1861, because the green valleys reminded him of the Pampa de Junín, location of the Battle of Junín in Peru.

== History ==
Before the Spanish conquest of the Muisca, the green hills of Junín, then called Chipazaque, were a shared terrain between the zipa of Bacatá and the zaque of Hunza. The conquistadors reached the area of Junín in 1550 and founded the modern town.

== Economy ==
Main economical activities of Junín are agriculture, livestock farming and tourism.

== Gallery ==
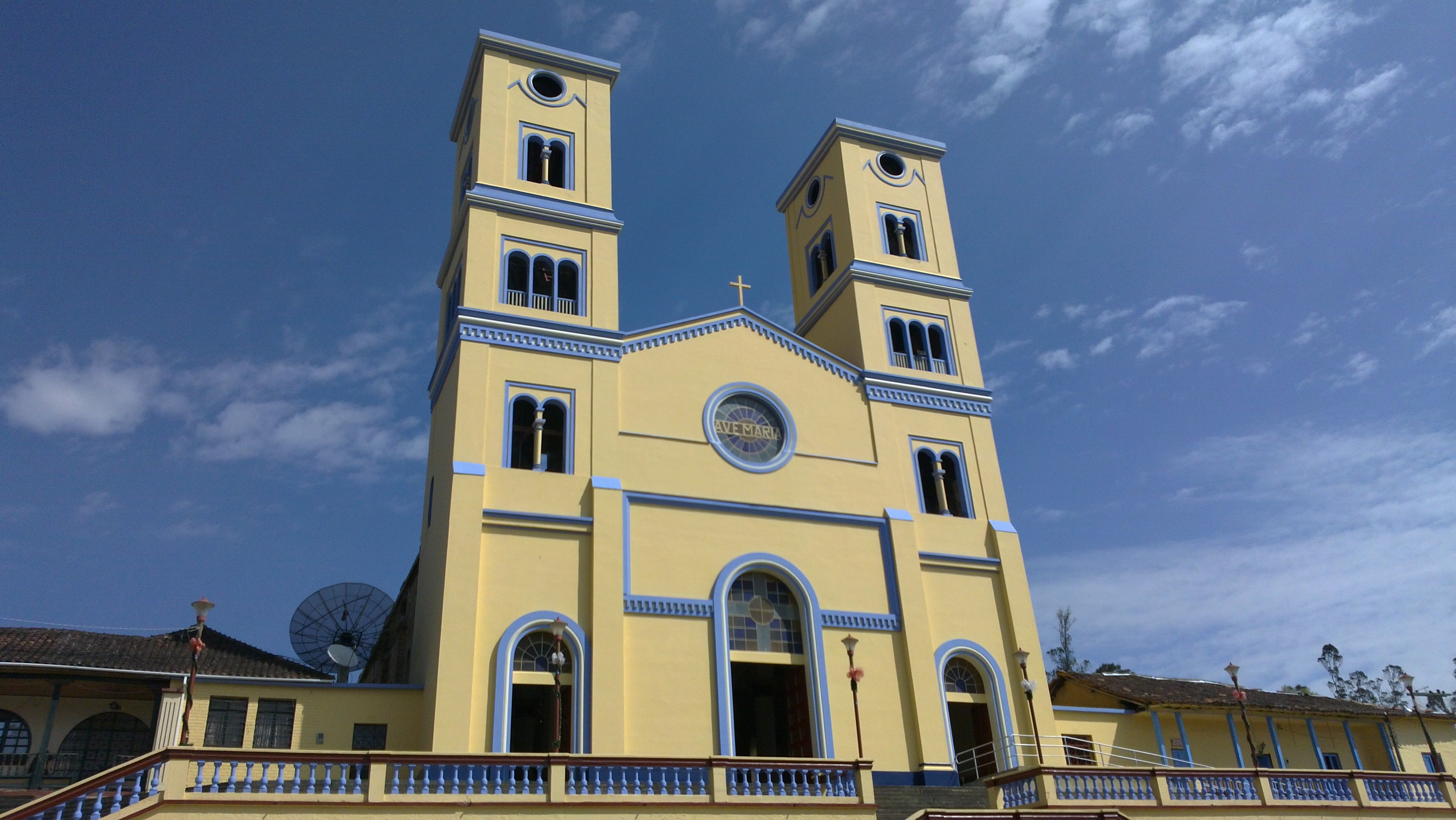
Church

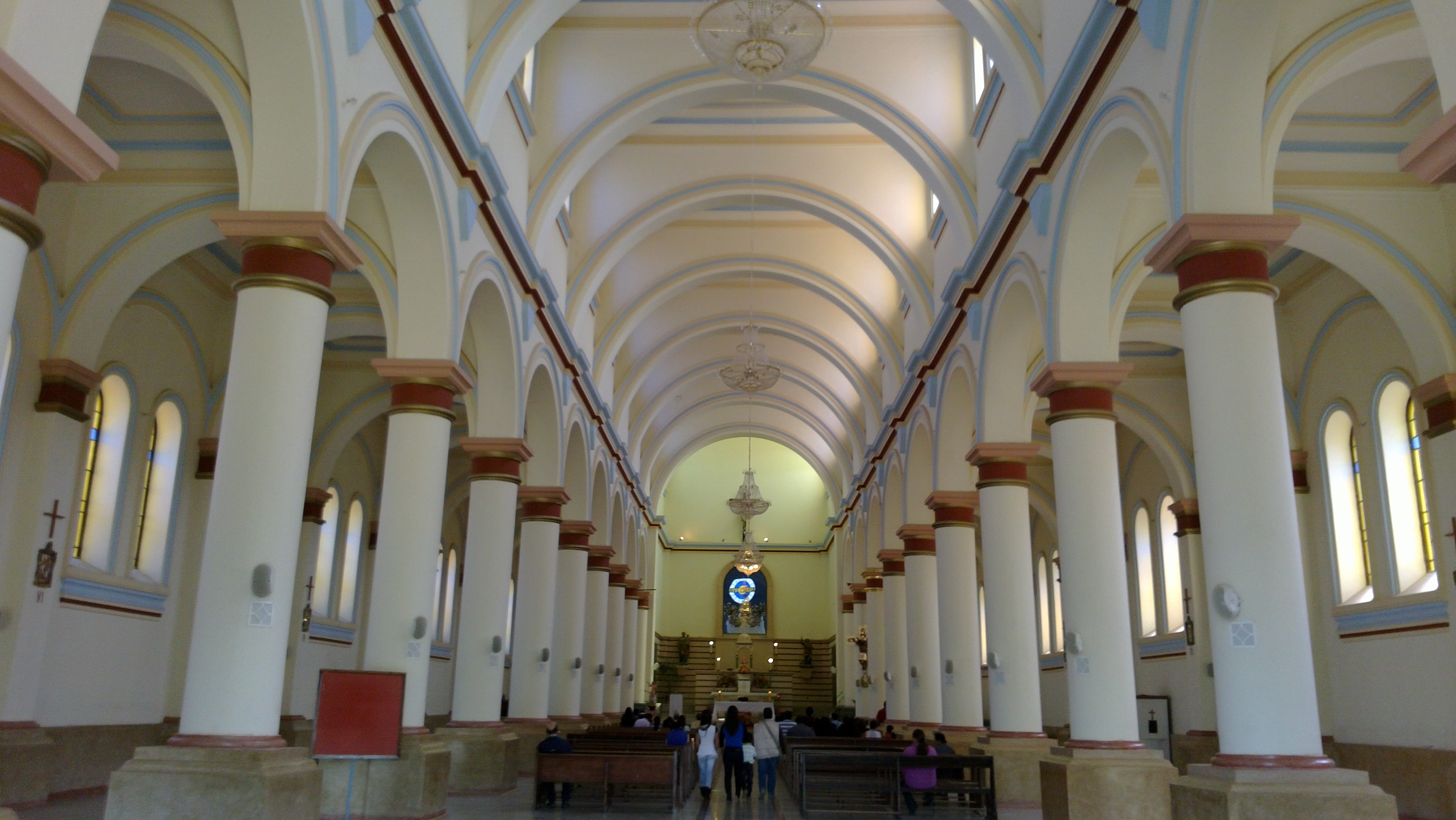
Church interior

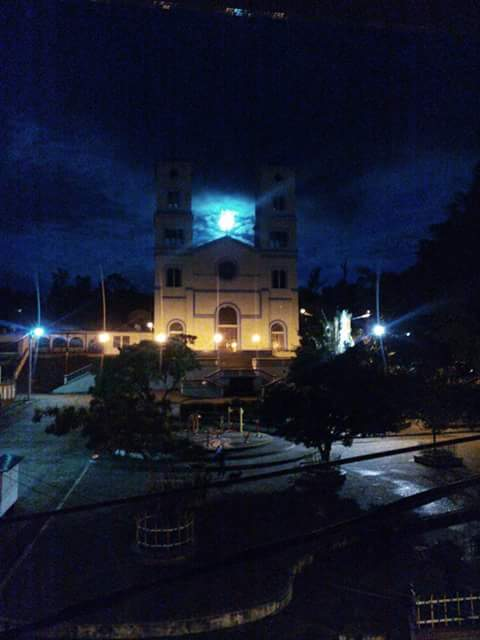
Church at night

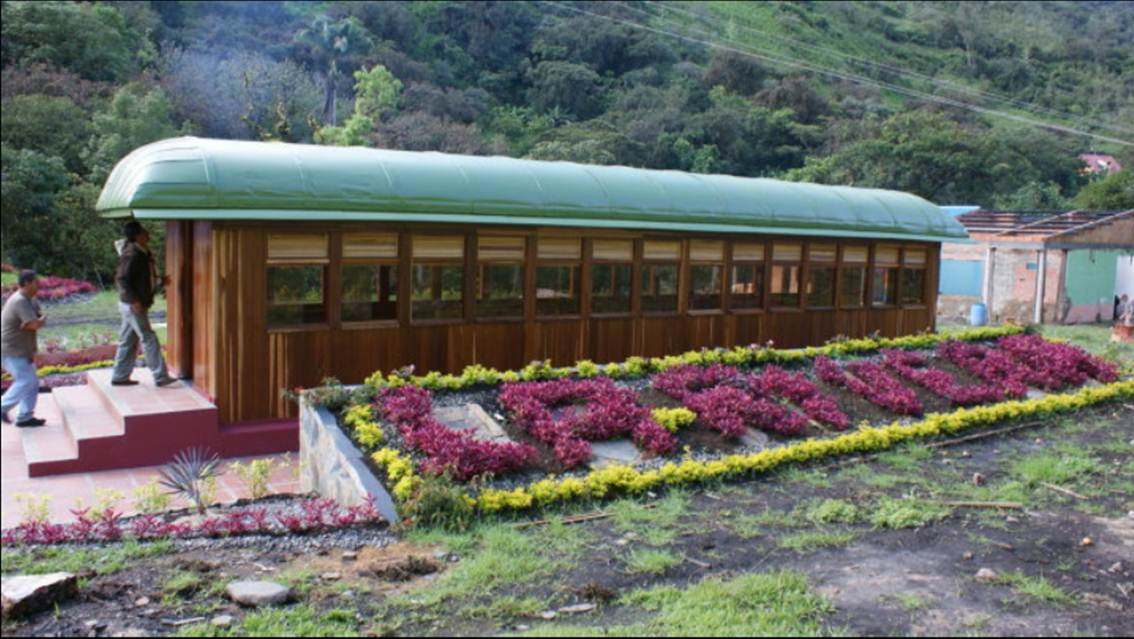
Train in Junín

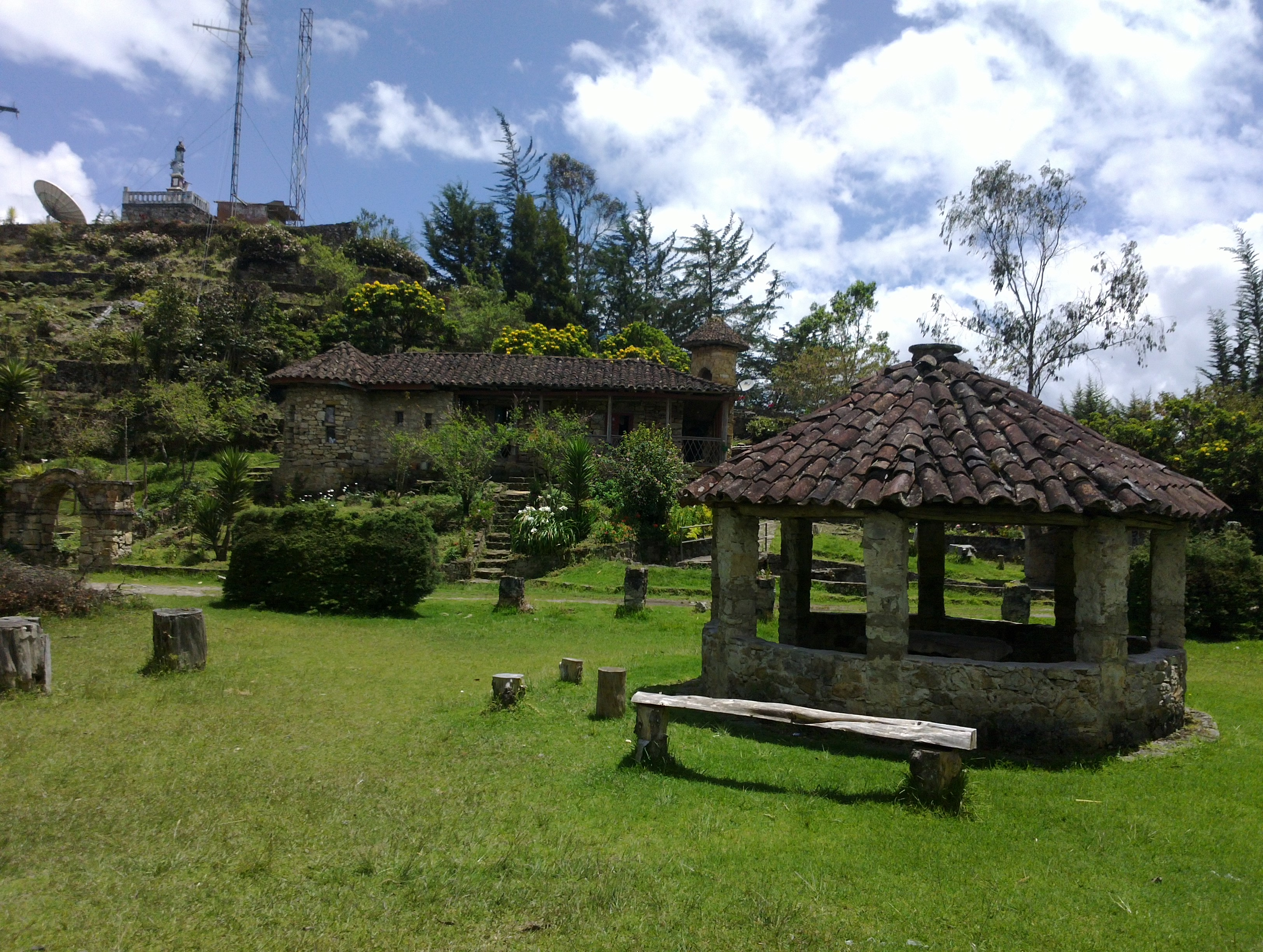
Parque Ararat
