= Alberto Lleras Dam =

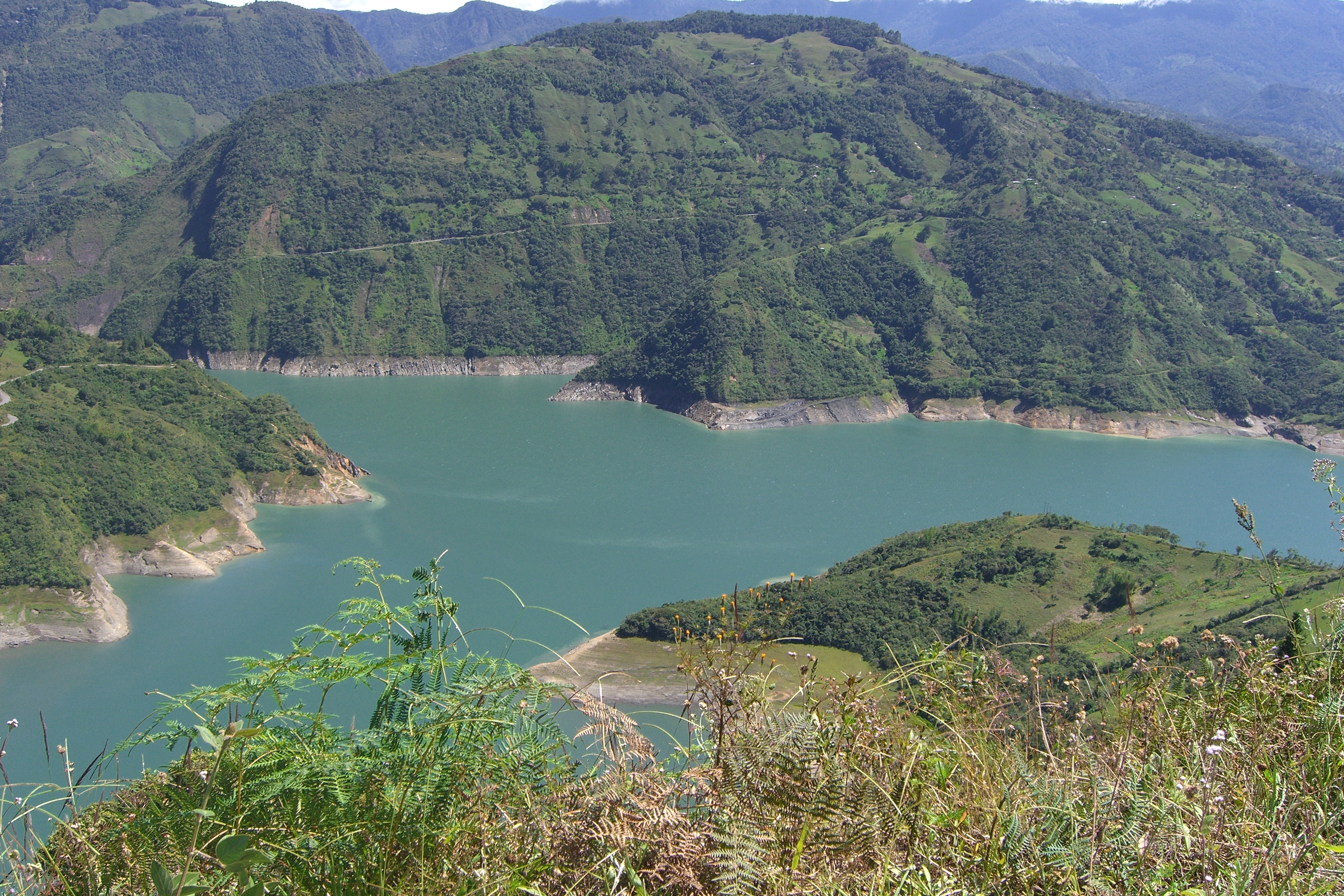

- Location within Colombia
- Official name: Embalse del Guavio
- Location: Guavio, Colombia
- Coordinates: 04°43′29″N 73°28′59″W
- Opening date: 1989
- Owner: Endesa

Dam and spillways
- Height: 243 m (797 ft)
- Length: 390 m (1,280 ft)
- Dam volume: 17,100,000 m^{3} (600,000,000 cu ft)
- Spillway capacity: 4,200 m^{3}/s (150,000 cu ft/s)

Reservoir
- Total capacity: 1,043×10^{6} m^{3} (846,000 acre⋅ft)

Power Station
- Commission date: 1992
- Hydraulic head: 1,100 m (3,600 ft)
- Turbines: 5 x 230 MW (310,000 hp) Pelton-type
- Installed capacity: 1,150 MW (1,540,000 hp)
- Annual generation: 5,890 GWh (21,200 TJ)

The Alberto Lleras Dam, also known as the Guavio Dam, is a rock-fill embankment dam on the Guavio River near Guavio, Colombia.

The dam was built in 1989 with a height of 243 metres (797 ft). The dam has an installed hydroelectric generation capacity of 1,150 megawatts (1,540,000 hp), a crest length of 390 metres (1,280 ft), and a structural volume of 17,100,000 cubic metres (600,000,000 cu ft).

The dam is named as for Alberto Lleras Camargo (3 July 1906 – 4 January 1990) who was the 20th President of Colombia (1958–1962).

== See also ==
- List of conventional hydroelectric power stations
- List of power stations in Colombia
