= Guavio River =

Location
- Country: Colombia

Physical characteristics
- Mouth
  - location: Upía River

Guavio River (Spanish: Río Guavio) is a river of central Colombia. It is a right tributary of the Upía River, in the drainage area of the Orinoco.

Important tributaries are the Chivor and Garagoa Rivers.

The Alberto Lleras Dam is situated on the Guavio River.

== See also ==
- List of rivers of Colombia
