= Guatavita =

- Municipality and town
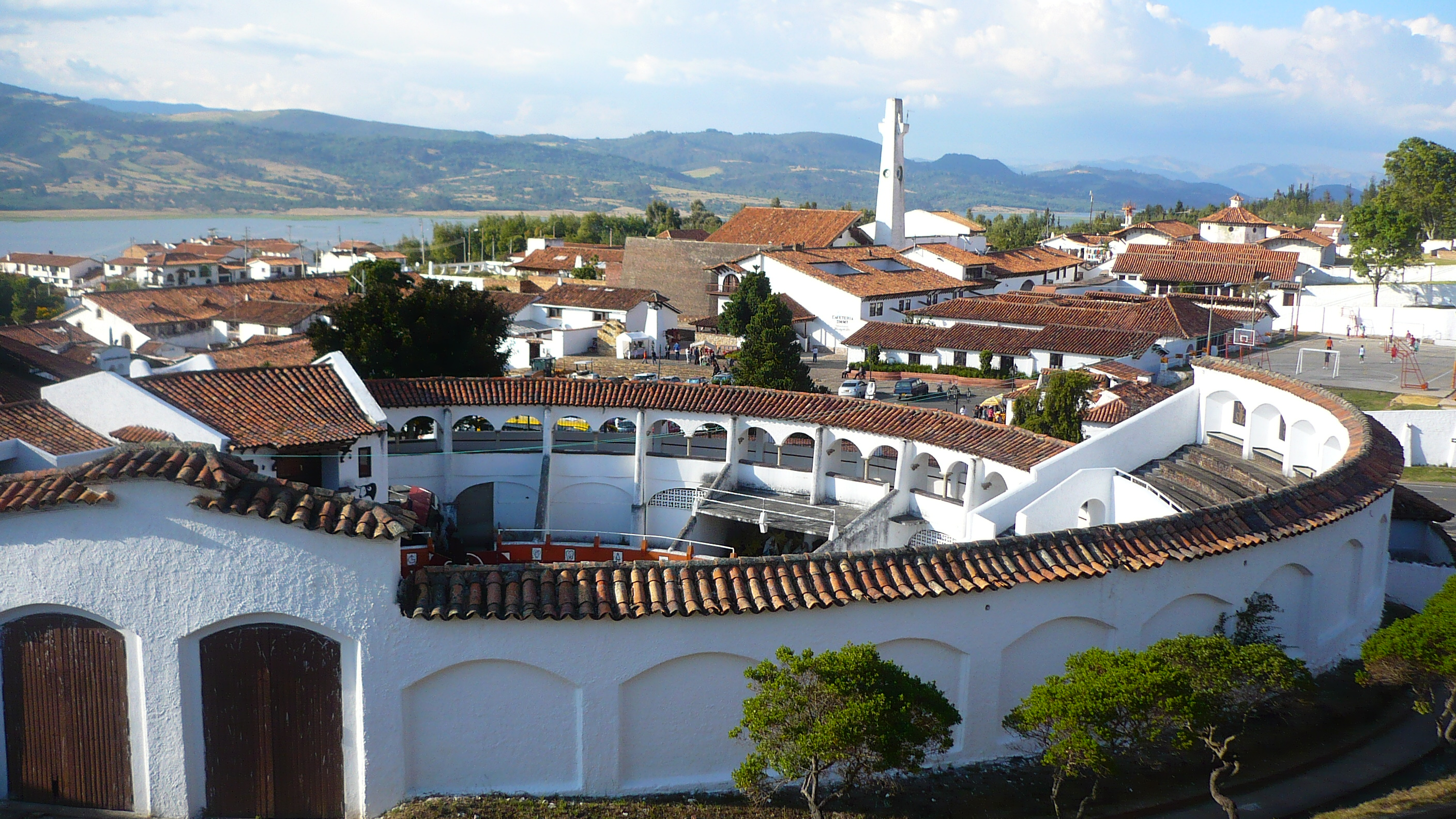
- Coliseum of Guatavita

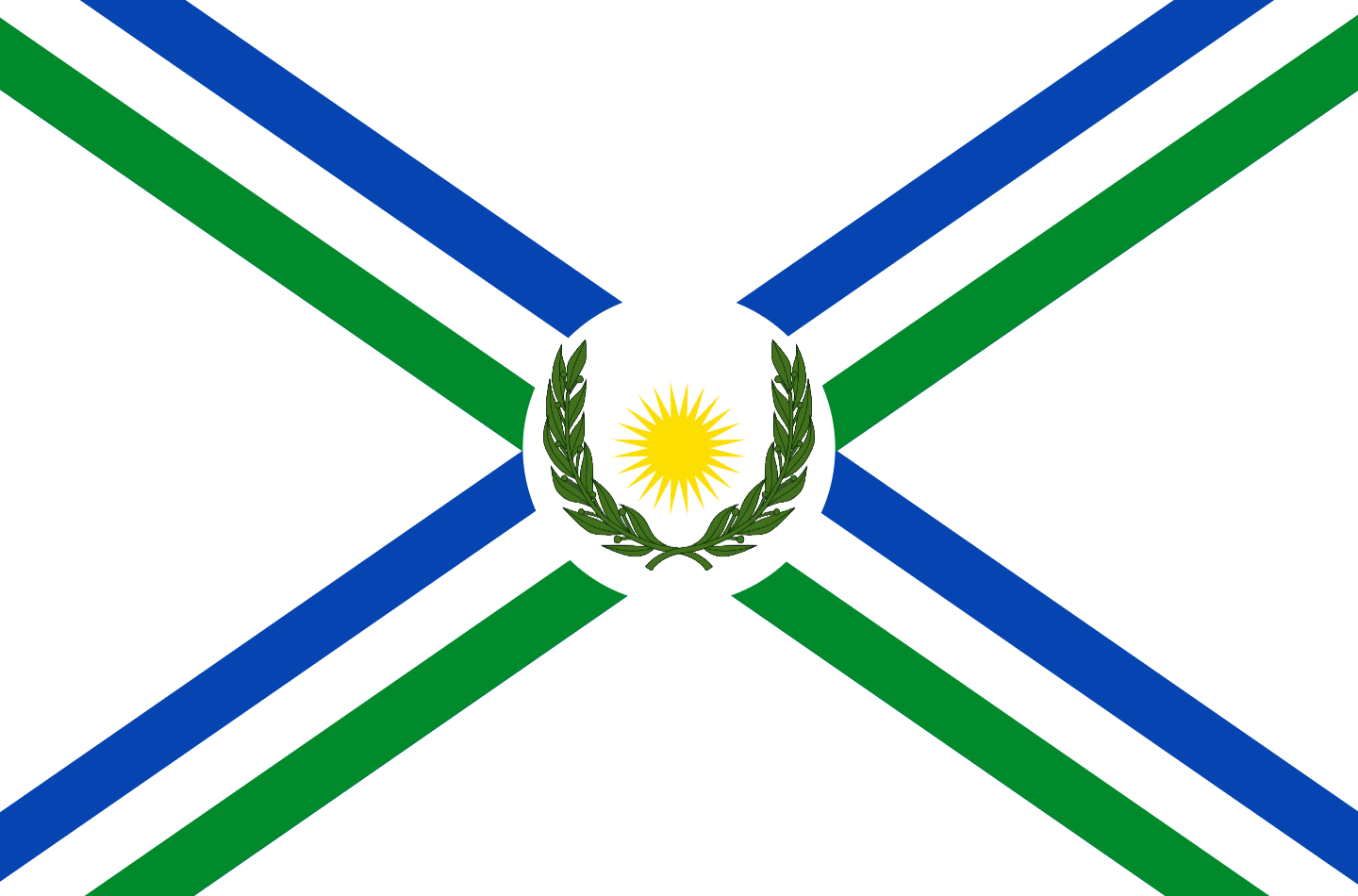
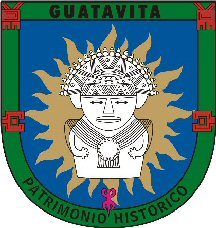
- Flag Coat of arms

- Location of the municipality and town of Guatavita in the Cundinamarca Department of Colombia

- Location in Colombia
- Coordinates: 4°56′4″N 73°50′4″W
- Country: Colombia
- Department: Cundinamarca
- Province: Guavio Province
- Founded: 18 March 1593
- Founder: Miguel de Ibarra

Government
  - Mayor: Robeth Yamit Peña Romero (2016-2019)

Area
  - Municipality and town: 247.3 km^{2} (95.5 sq mi)
  - Urban: 6.84 km^{2} (2.64 sq mi)
- Elevation: 2,680 m (8,790 ft)

Population (2015)
  - Municipality and town: 6,898
  - Density: 27.89/km^{2} (72.24/sq mi)
  - Urban: 1,960
- Time zone: UTC-5 (Colombia Standard Time)
- Website: Official website

Guatavita is a municipality and town of Colombia in the Guavio Province of the department of Cundinamarca. Guatavita is located 75 km northeast of the capital Bogotá. It borders Sesquilé and Machetá in the north, Gachetá and Junín in the east, Guasca in the south and in the west are Tocancipá and Gachancipá.

== History ==
Before the Spanish conquest of the Muisca on the Altiplano Cundiboyacense, the central plateau in the Colombian Andes, the area was inhabited by the Muisca organized in their Muisca Confederation. Guatavita was ruled by a cacique who was a powerful figure consulted by the zipas of Bacatá and the zaques of Hunza. Guatavita was specialized in gold working. An important temple honouring Sué, the Sun god in the religion of the Muisca was constructed in Guatavita.

In the Guatavita Lake the new zipa was inaugurated in rituals performed by the cacique of Guatavita, represented by the famous golden Muisca raft. Around 1490 the Battle of Chocontá took place where zaque Michuá was supported by the cacique of Guatavita and lost with their outnumbered army of 60,000 guecha warriors against the zipa Saguamanchica. Both Muisca rulers died in this battle.

Modern Guatavita was founded on March 18, 1593, by Miguel de Ibarra.

Guatavita was rebuilt on higher ground in the mid-1960s due to the construction of the Tominé Reservoir, which intentionally flooded the area of the town.

== Etymology ==
In the Chibcha language of the Muisca, Guachetá means "end of the farming fields" or "point of the mountain range".

== Economy ==
Main economical activities in Guatavita are agriculture, mining and tourism. In terms of agriculture most common are potatoes, maize, barley and peas. Tourism is mainly in the weekends when craft markets open in town.

== Guatavita Lake ==
The sacred and ceremonial Lake Guatavita, of the pre-Columbian Muisca is located nearby, within the Sesquilé municipality of Almeidas Province.

== Climate ==
Climate data for Guatavita, elevation 2,625 m (8,612 ft), (1971–2000)
Month	Jan	Feb	Mar	Apr	May	Jun	Jul	Aug	Sep	Oct	Nov	Dec	Year
Mean daily maximum °C (°F)	20.5 (68.9)	20.6 (69.1)	20.7 (69.3)	20.1 (68.2)	19.2 (66.6)	18.1 (64.6)	17.8 (64.0)	18.3 (64.9)	19.0 (66.2)	19.5 (67.1)	19.6 (67.3)	19.7 (67.5)	19.4 (66.9)
Daily mean °C (°F)	13.7 (56.7)	14.0 (57.2)	14.4 (57.9)	14.4 (57.9)	14.3 (57.7)	13.5 (56.3)	13.1 (55.6)	13.2 (55.8)	13.5 (56.3)	13.7 (56.7)	13.9 (57.0)	13.7 (56.7)	13.8 (56.8)
Mean daily minimum °C (°F)	8.6 (47.5)	9.3 (48.7)	10.2 (50.4)	10.8 (51.4)	10.8 (51.4)	10.5 (50.9)	10.2 (50.4)	9.7 (49.5)	9.4 (48.9)	9.7 (49.5)	10 (50)	8.9 (48.0)	9.8 (49.6)
Average precipitation mm (inches)	32.0 (1.26)	40.9 (1.61)	65.2 (2.57)	89.9 (3.54)	78.7 (3.10)	52.6 (2.07)	50.0 (1.97)	47.6 (1.87)	53.8 (2.12)	73.1 (2.88)	58.8 (2.31)	46.1 (1.81)	688.6 (27.11)
Average precipitation days	7	10	14	17	19	21	22	20	16	15	13	10	184
Average relative humidity (%)	74	74	76	79	79	79	78	78	78	79	78	76	77
Source: Instituto de Hidrologia Meteorologia y Estudios Ambientales

== Gallery ==
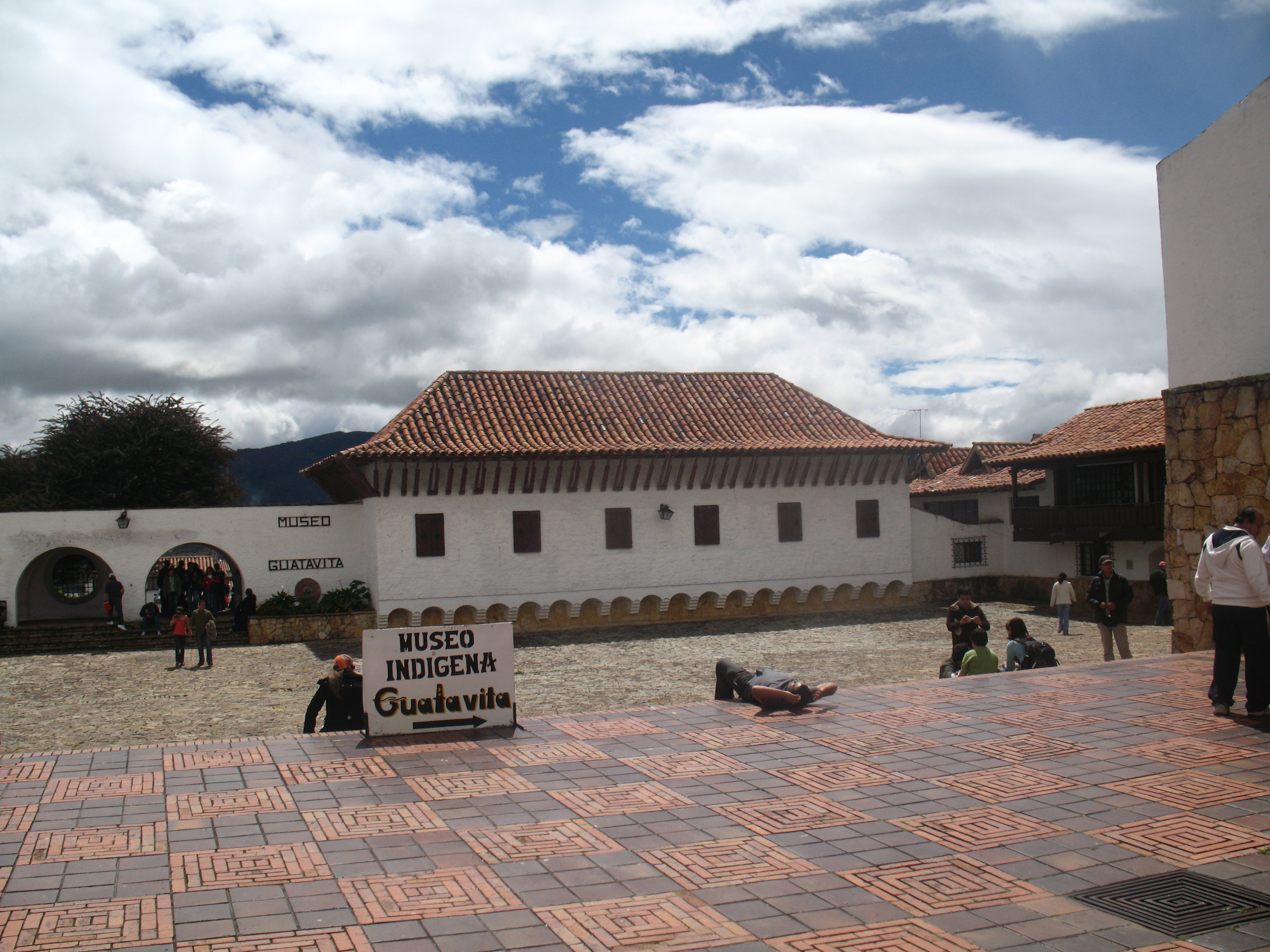
Central square

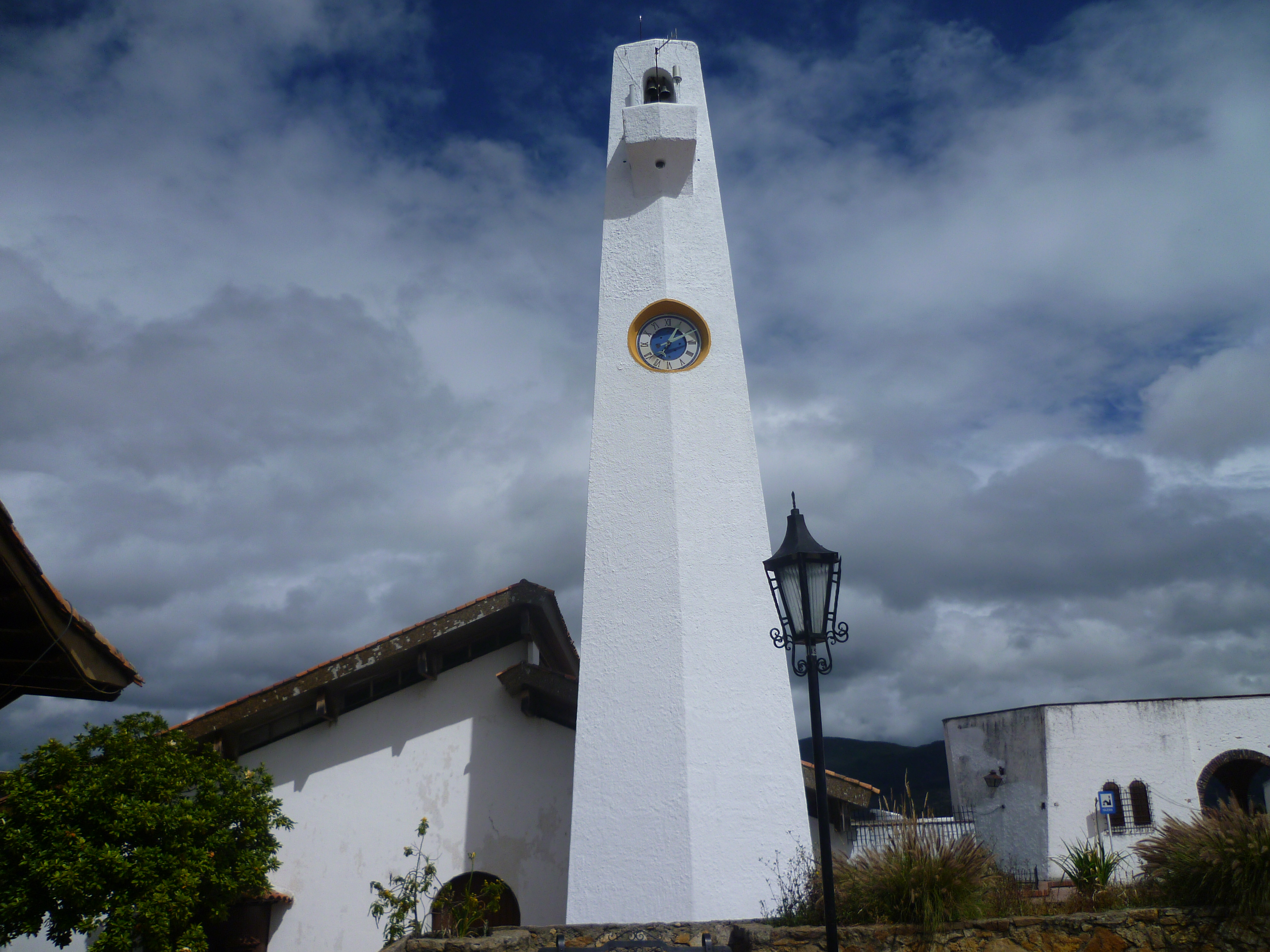
Obelisk

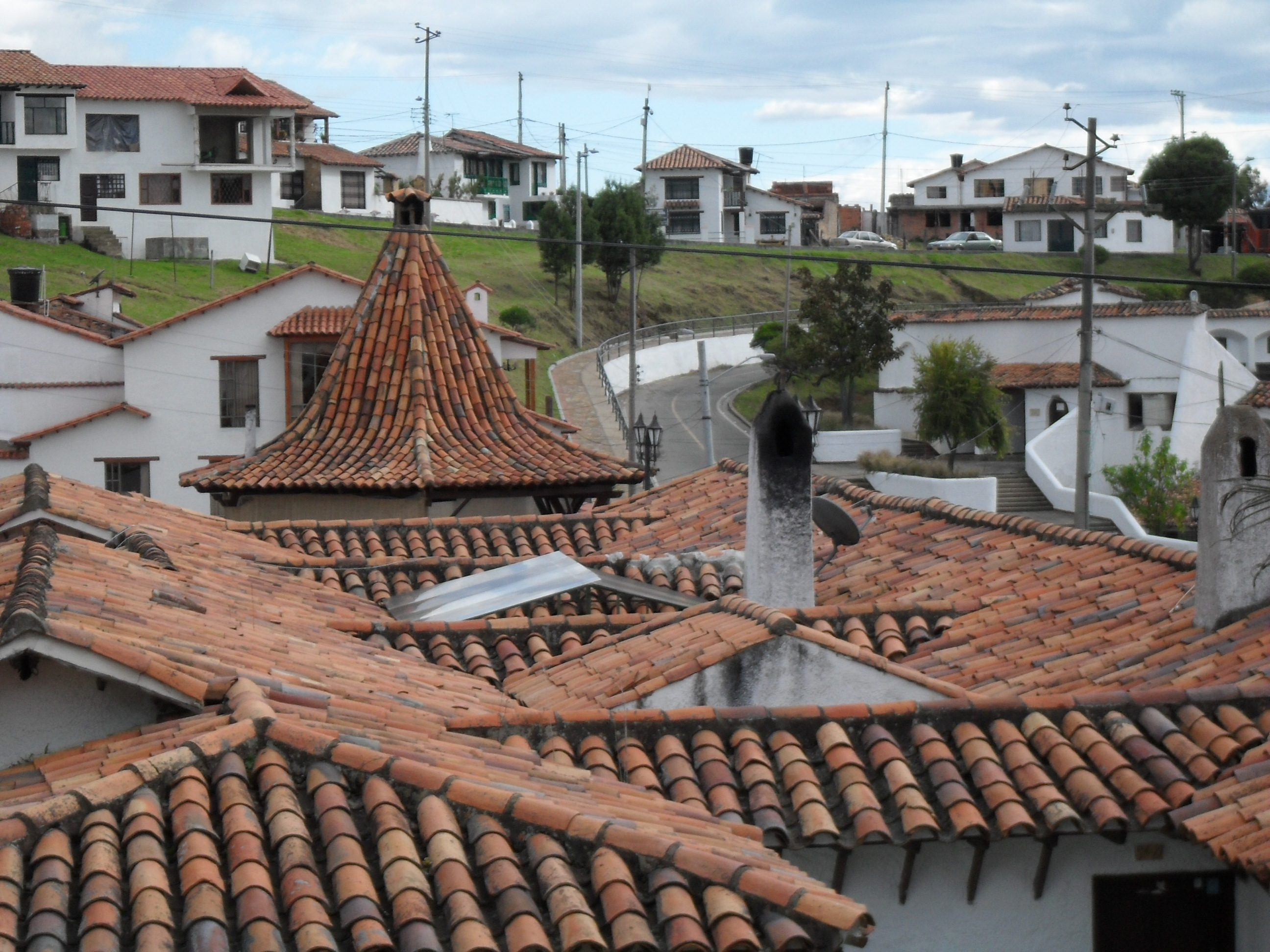
Typical houses

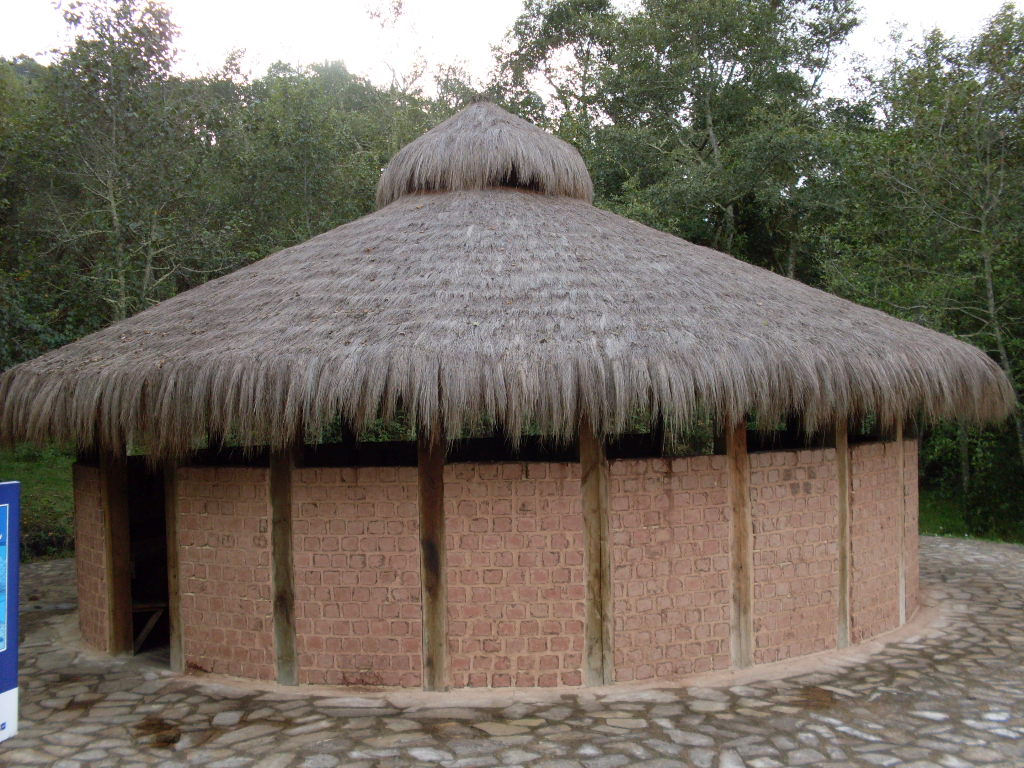
Reconstructed bohío of the Muisca
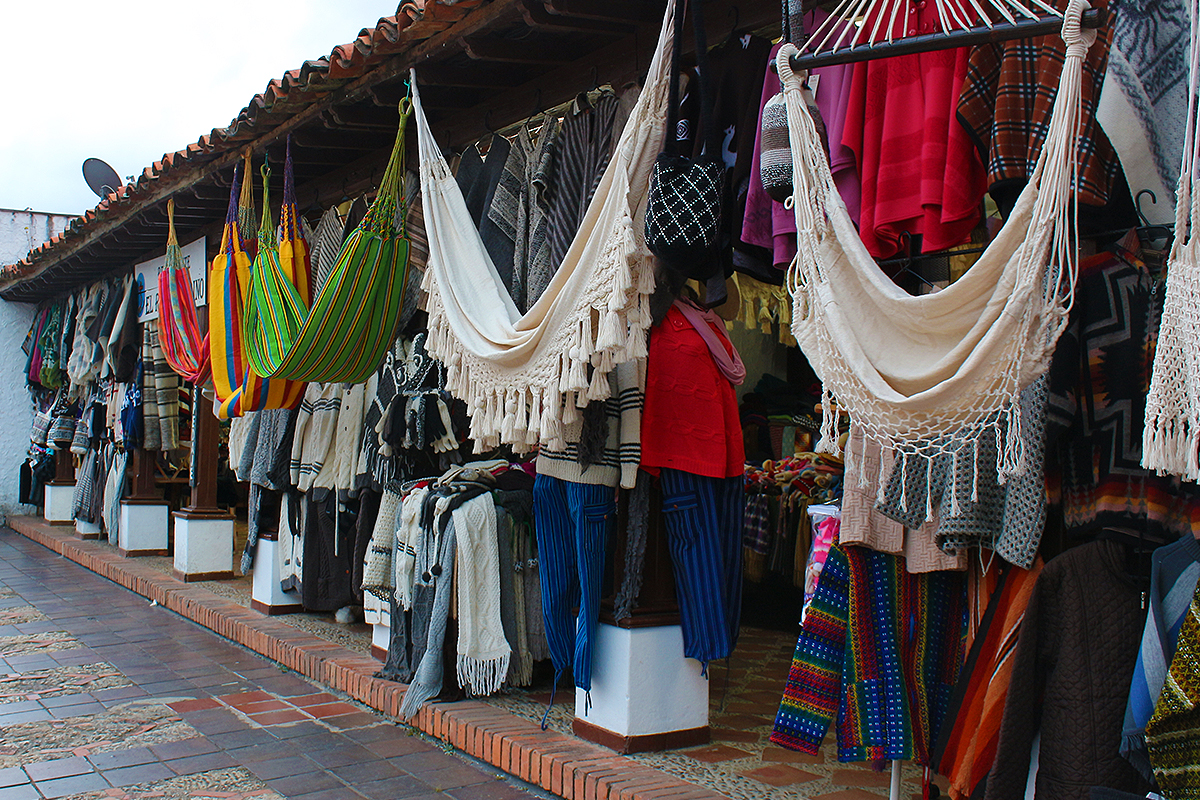
Crafts market

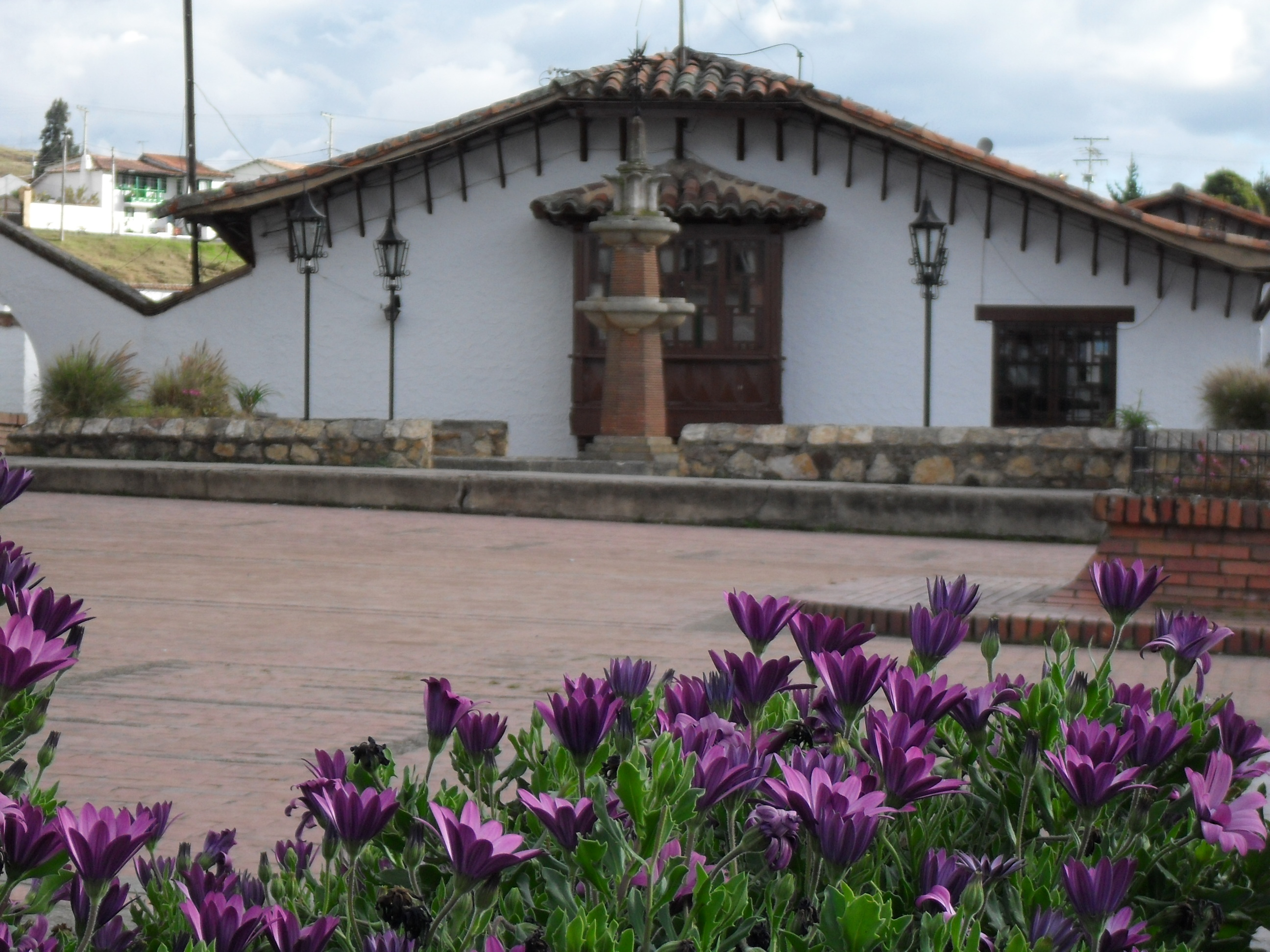
Flowers and park

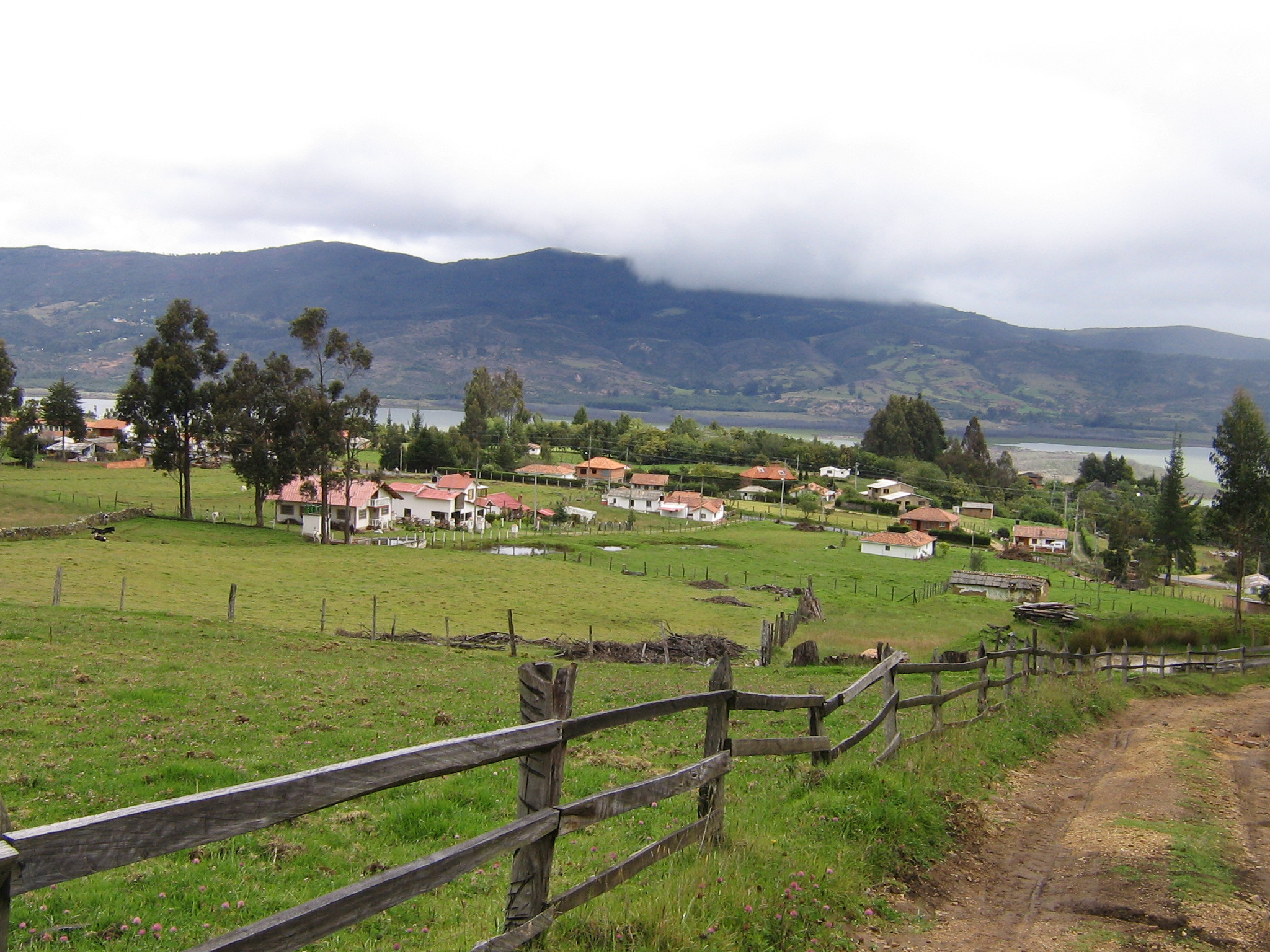
Rural area

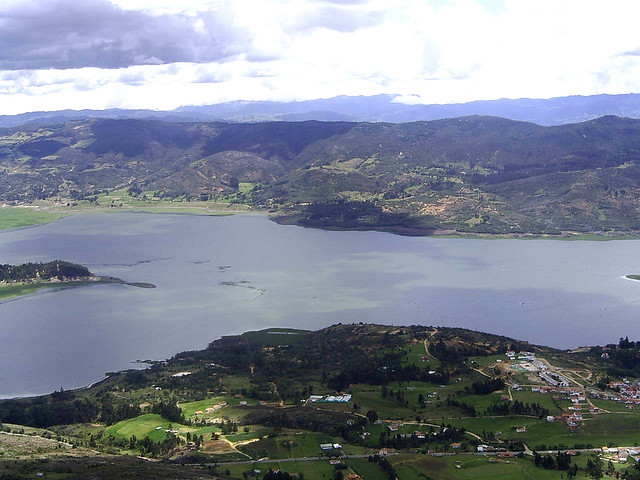
Tominé Reservoir
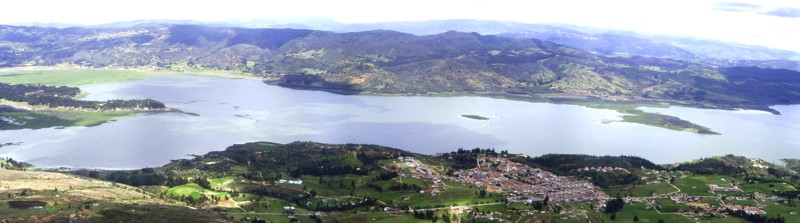
Panorama of Guatavita and Tominé Reservoir
