= Medina, Cundinamarca =

Medina
- Municipality and town
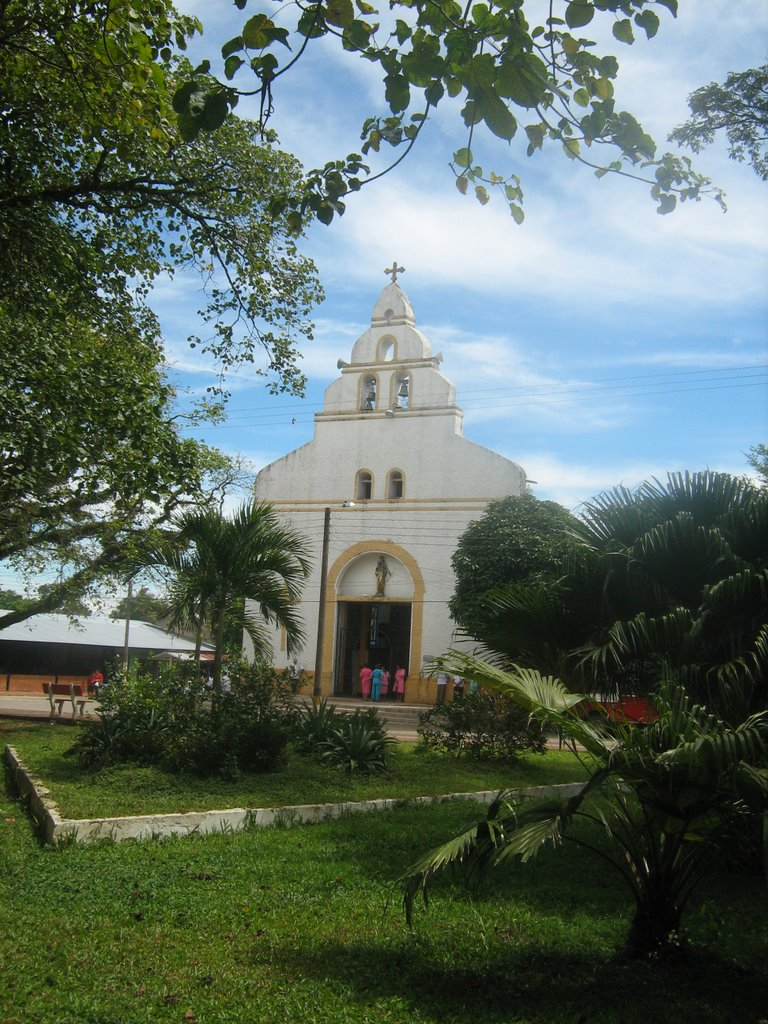

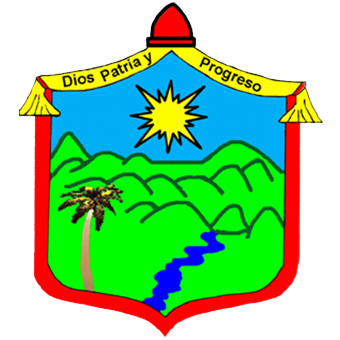
- Flag Coat of arms

- Location of the municipality and town of Medina in the Cundinamarca Department of Colombia

- Location in Colombia
- Coordinates: 4°30′33″N 73°20′58″W
- Country: Colombia
- Department: Cundinamarca

Population (Census 2018)
  - Total: 7,281
- Time zone: UTC-5 (Colombia Standard Time)

Medina is a municipality and town of Colombia in the department of Cundinamarca.

== Climate ==
Medina has a tropical monsoon climate (Köppen Am) with heavy to very heavy rainfall in all months except January.

Climate data for Medina
Month	Jan	Feb	Mar	Apr	May	Jun	Jul	Aug	Sep	Oct	Nov	Dec	Year
Mean daily maximum °C (°F)	31.1 (88.0)	31.5 (88.7)	31.1 (88.0)	29.8 (85.6)	29.1 (84.4)	28.3 (82.9)	28.3 (82.9)	28.9 (84.0)	29.5 (85.1)	29.7 (85.5)	29.8 (85.6)	30.1 (86.2)	29.8 (85.6)
Daily mean °C (°F)	25.5 (77.9)	26.0 (78.8)	25.9 (78.6)	25.0 (77.0)	24.5 (76.1)	23.8 (74.8)	23.7 (74.7)	24.1 (75.4)	24.4 (75.9)	24.7 (76.5)	24.8 (76.6)	24.8 (76.6)	24.8 (76.6)
Mean daily minimum °C (°F)	19.9 (67.8)	20.6 (69.1)	20.7 (69.3)	20.3 (68.5)	19.9 (67.8)	19.4 (66.9)	19.1 (66.4)	19.3 (66.7)	19.4 (66.9)	19.7 (67.5)	19.8 (67.6)	19.6 (67.3)	19.8 (67.6)
Average rainfall mm (inches)	54.1 (2.13)	114.0 (4.49)	181.9 (7.16)	430.9 (16.96)	517.3 (20.37)	492.7 (19.40)	447.0 (17.60)	362.7 (14.28)	335.3 (13.20)	350.9 (13.81)	312.2 (12.29)	106.5 (4.19)	3,705.5 (145.88)
Average rainy days	4	6	10	18	20	20	19	16	14	14	13	7	161
Source 1:
Source 2:
