= Ubalá =

- Municipality and town
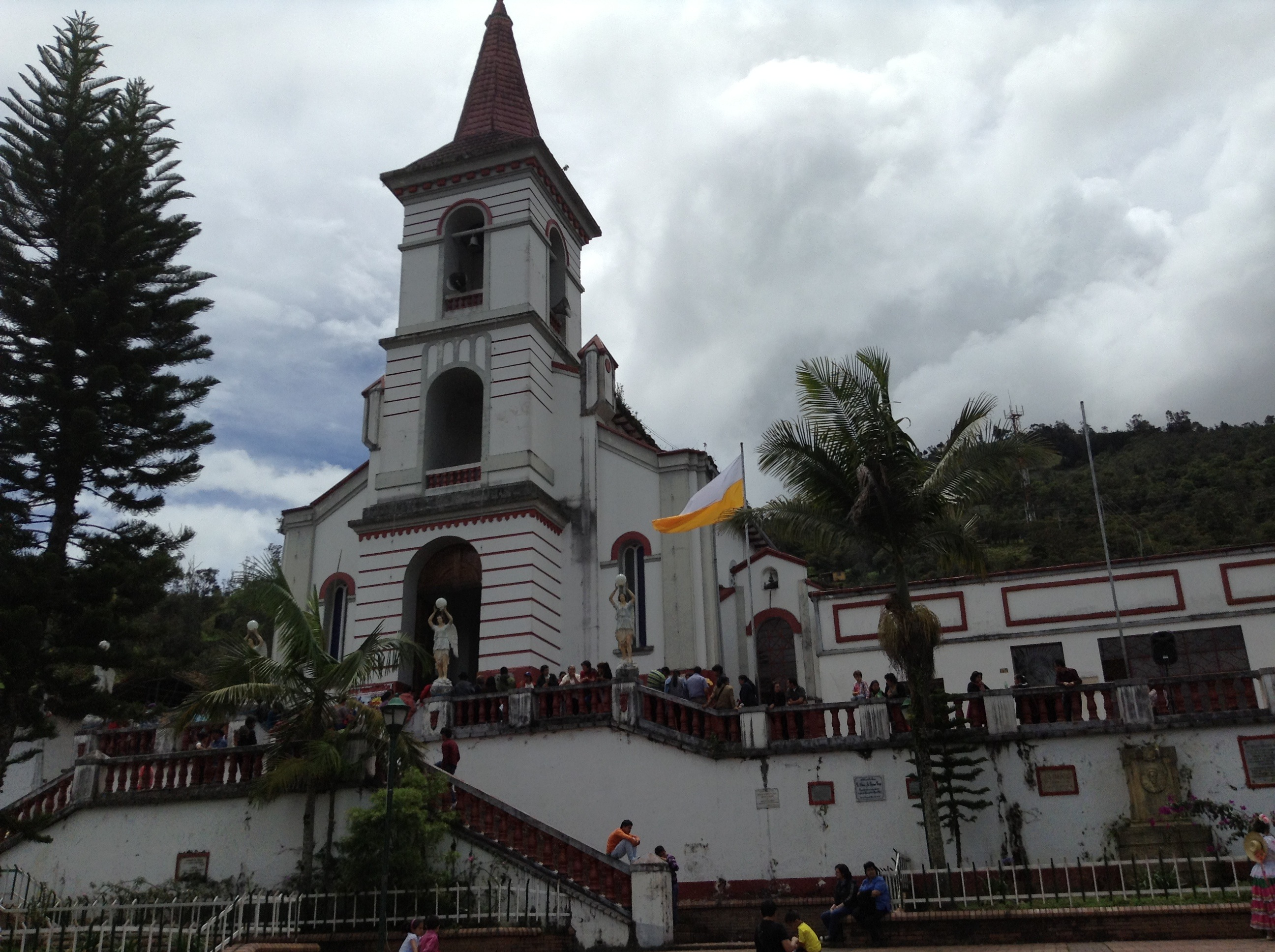
- Church of Ubalá

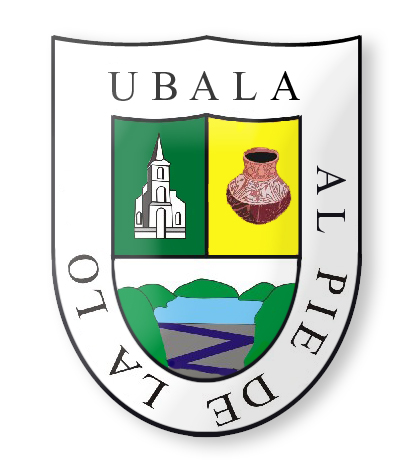
- Flag Coat of arms

- Location of the municipality and town inside Cundinamarca Department of Colombia

- Location in Colombia
- Coordinates: 4°44′38″N 73°32′5″W
- Country: Colombia
- Department: Cundinamarca
- Province: Guavio Province
- Founded: 23 October 1846
- Founder: Ospina Rodríguez

Government
  - Mayor: Danilo Antonio Salinas Martínez (2016-2019)

Area
  - Municipality and town: 505 km^{2} (195 sq mi)
- Elevation: 1,949 m (6,394 ft)

Population (2015)
  - Municipality and town: 10,718
  - Density: 21.2/km^{2} (55.0/sq mi)
  - Urban: 1,280
- Time zone: UTC-5 (Colombia Standard Time)
- Website: Official website

Ubalá is a municipality and town of Colombia in the department of Cundinamarca. It is located in the Eastern Ranges of the Colombian Andes. It is the only municipality of Cundinamarca that is split in two parts.

== Climate ==
Ubalá - 1949 m

Climate chart (precipitation, max. and min. temperature)
J	F	M	A	M	J	J	A	S	O	N	D
47 23 11	93 24 12	136 24 13	216 23 14	290 22 14	360 21 13	332 21 13	276 21 13	205 22 12	188 22 13	132 23 13	72 23 12
- █ Average max. and min. temperatures in °C
- █ Precipitation totals in mm
- Source: Climate-data.org - Ubalá
Imperial conversion
J	F	M	A	M	J	J	A	S	O	N	D
1.9 74 52	3.7 74 54	5.4 74 56	8.5 73 57	11 72 57	14 70 56	13 70 55	11 70 55	8.1 71 54	7.4 72 55	5.2 73 55	2.8 73 54
- █ Average max. and min. temperatures in °F
- █ Precipitation totals in inches

== Etymology ==
In the Chibcha language of the Muisca, Ubalá means "Place on the hillside" or "At the foot of the hillside".

== History ==
The region west to Ubalá was inhabited by the Muisca before the Spanish conquistadores entered the Altiplano Cundiboyacense. To the east of Ubalá the indigenous Tegua were living and to the south the Guayupe.

Ubalá was properly founded on October 23, 1846 by Ospina Rodríguez.

== Administrative Division ==
The municipality of Ubalá is the only one in the department that is geographically divided into two zones and each has municipal inspections, which in turn have villages:

Ubalá A (western) It is characterized by being very mountainous and being on the northern shore of the Guavio Reservoir and has the following inspections:

1) Central: made up of the following villages: El Carmelo, Las Mercedes, Sagrado Corazón (which is the municipal urban area), San Antonio de Ubalá, San Isidro, San José, San Juan, San Luis, San Pablo, San Pedro, San Roque Oeste and Santa María.

2) Santa Rosa: created by agreement number 12 of September 12, 1907 and made up of the villages: Cascajal, El Carmen, San Antonio Rosa, Santa Rosa and Santa Rosita.

3) Laguna Azul: Villages: Betania, El Cartucho, El Eden, Laguna Azul, Rionegro, Robledal, Sanctuary and Sion

4) La Playa: Villages: La Playa, Mundo Nuevo, San Cayetano and Santa Teresa Oeste

5) Peñas Blancas: Villages: Cascades, La Mesa, Margaritas, Peñas Blancas and San Fernando

Ubalá B (eastern) Its main mountain range is the Medina cliffs, which separate the Guavio region from the Llanos de la Orinoquía. It is made up of the jurisdiction of three inspections:

1) Mambita: Villages: Algodones, Boca de Monte, Campo Hermoso, La Floresta, Mambita and San Roque Este

2)Soy: Villages: Gibraltar, La Romaza, San Luis Bajo and Soya

3) San Pedro de Jagua: Villages: Alto de San Luis, El Carmen, Gazajujo, Puerto Rico, San Pedro de Jagua and Santa Teresa.

== Economy ==
The main economical activity of Ubalá is mining, predominantly emeralds, iron ore, sandstones, clay and salt.

== Gallery ==
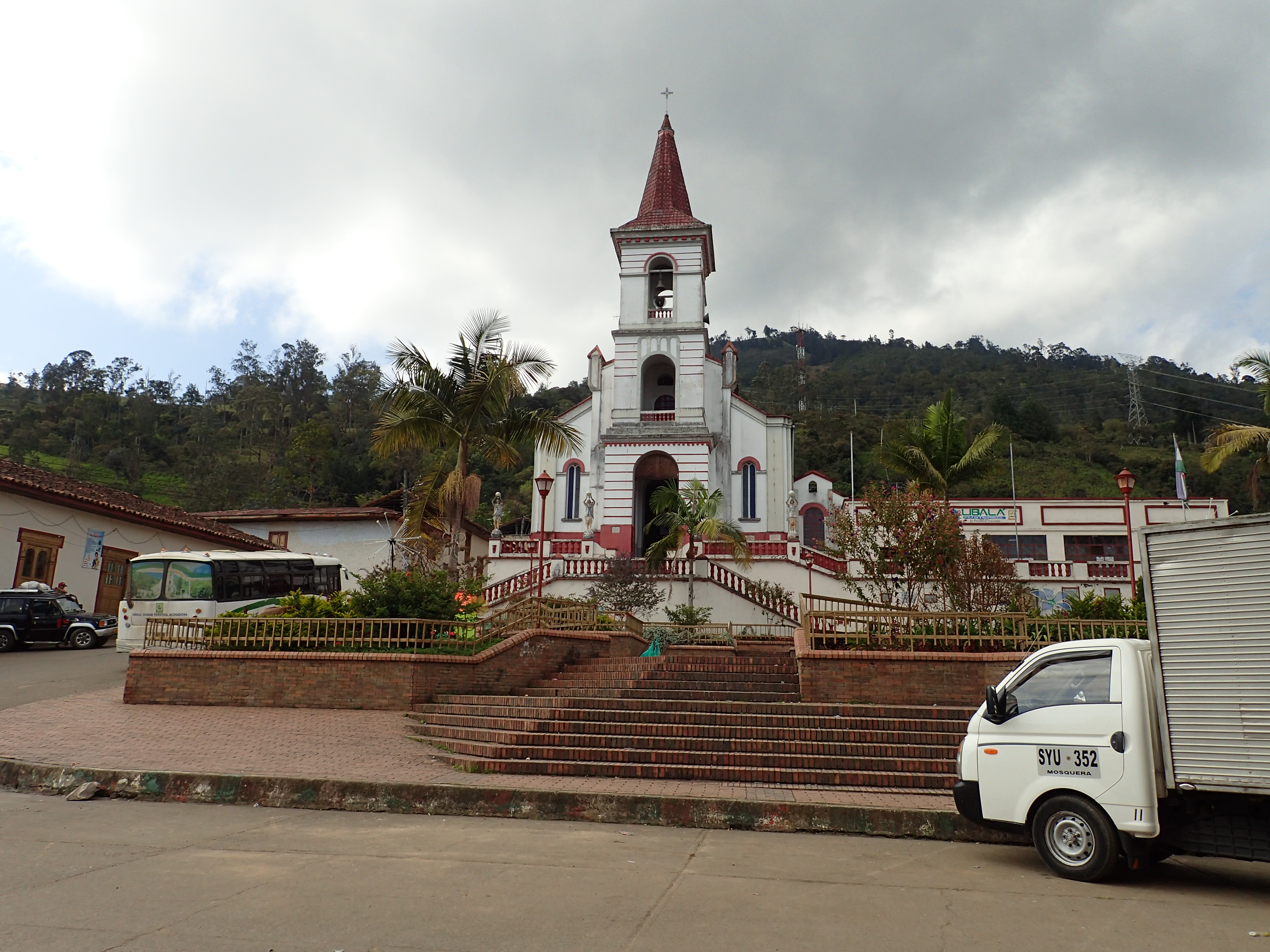
Church view

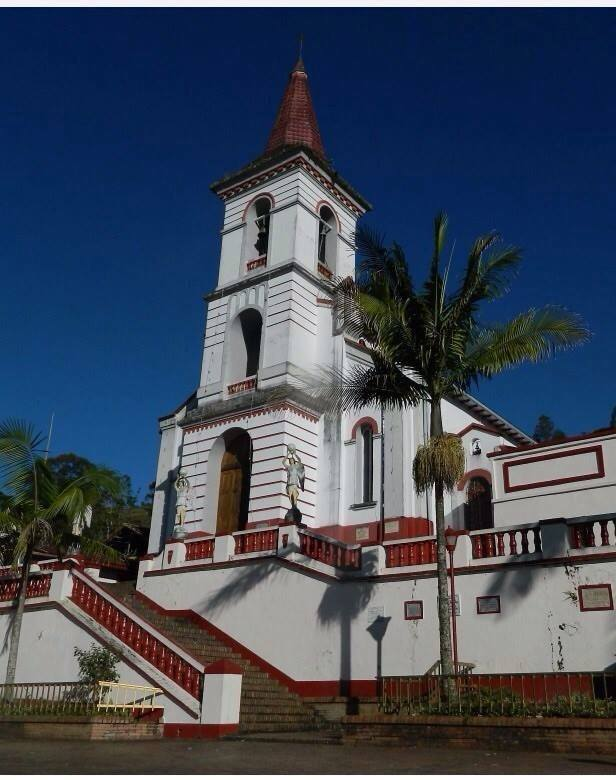
Church close-up

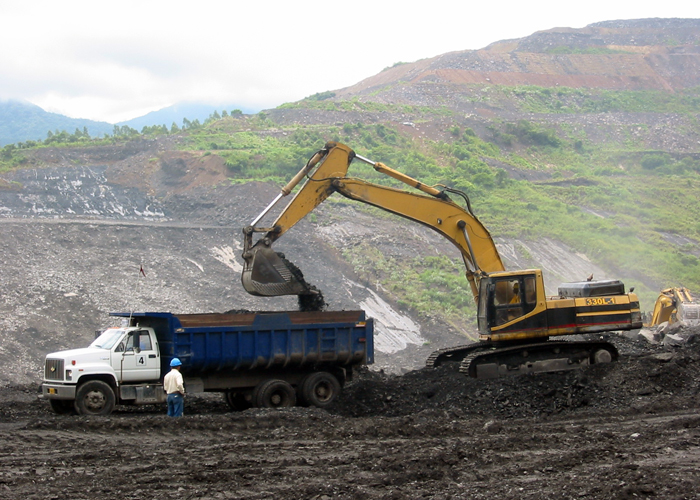
Mining iron ore

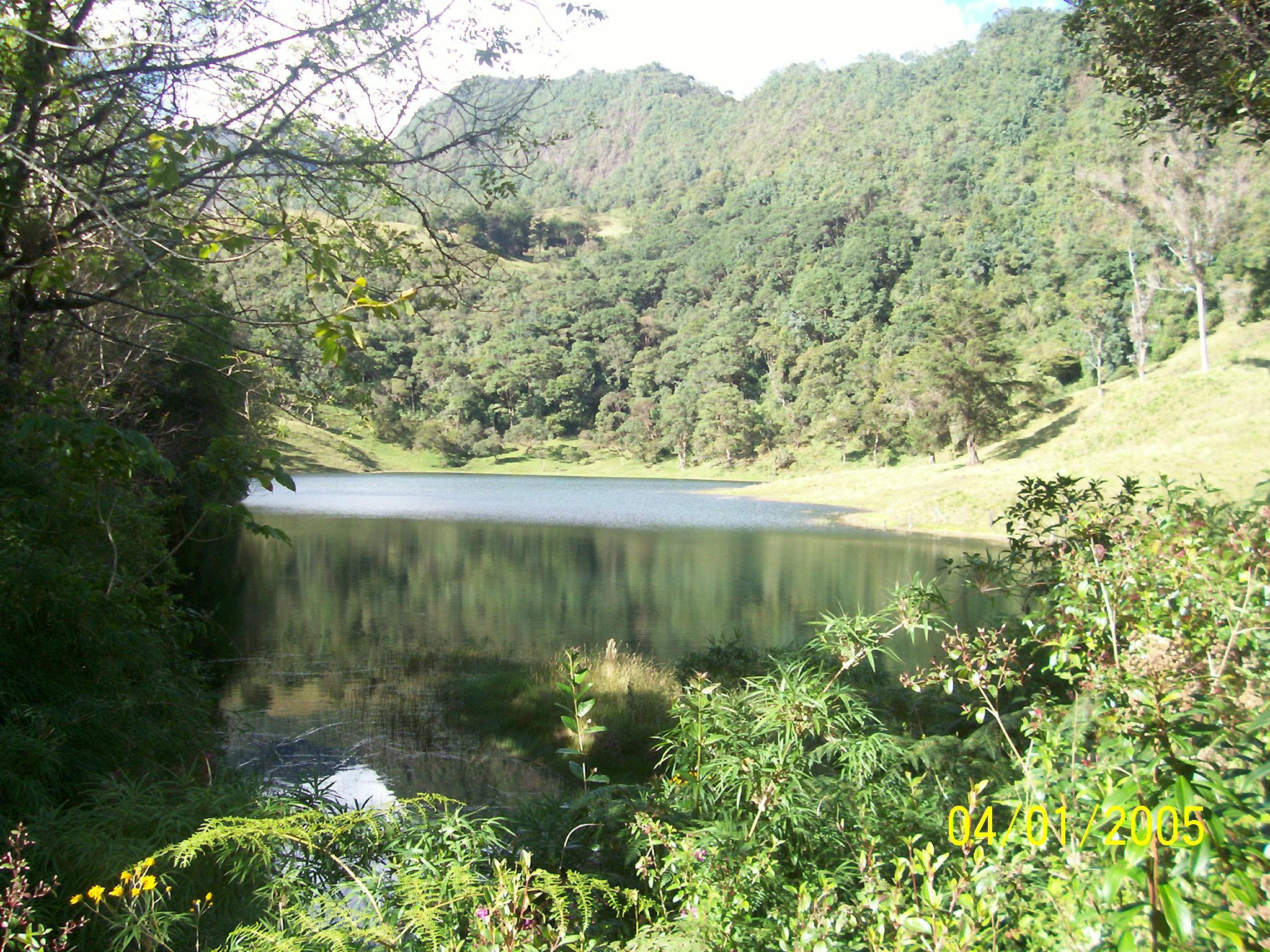
Laguna Verde

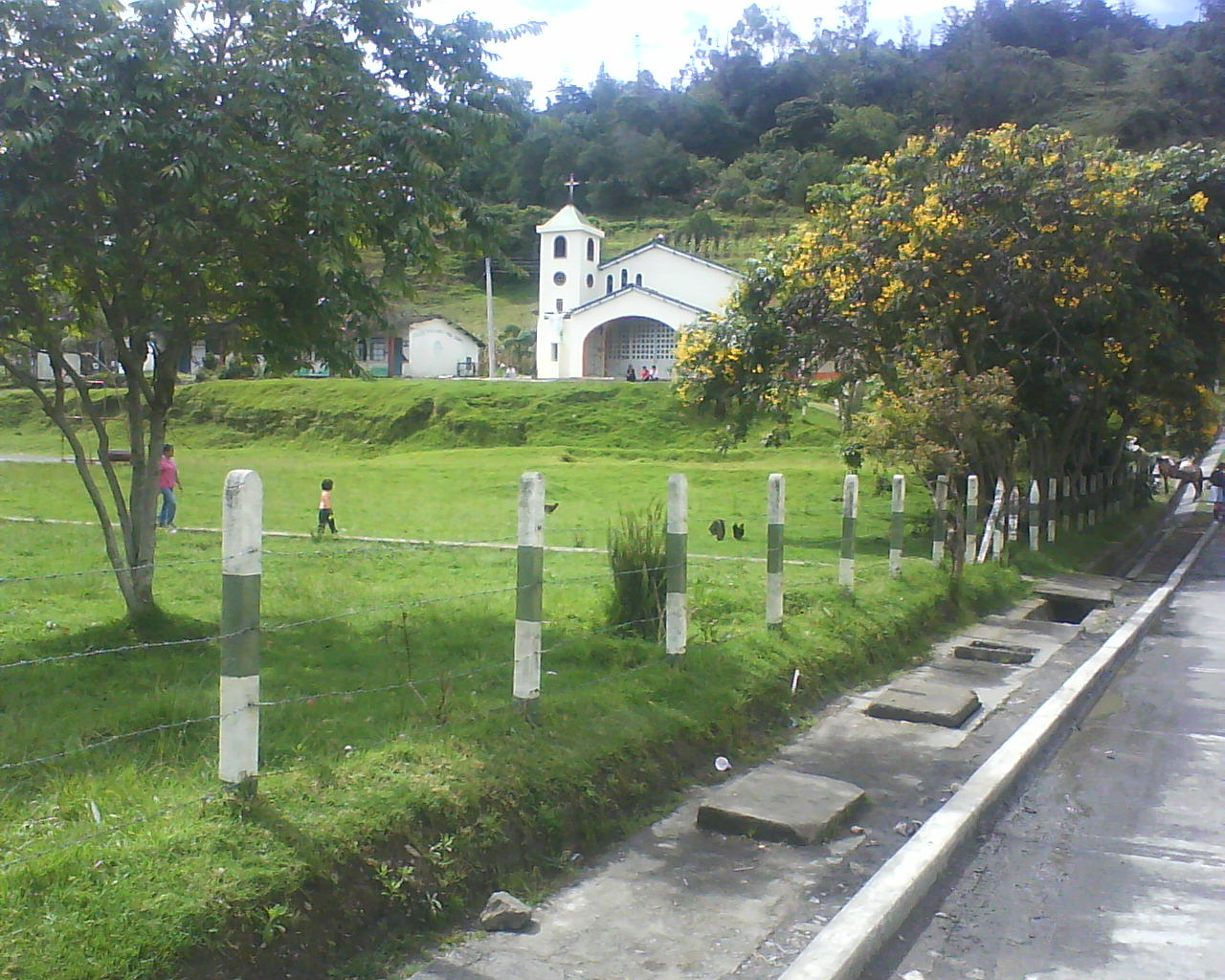
Rural part of Ubalá
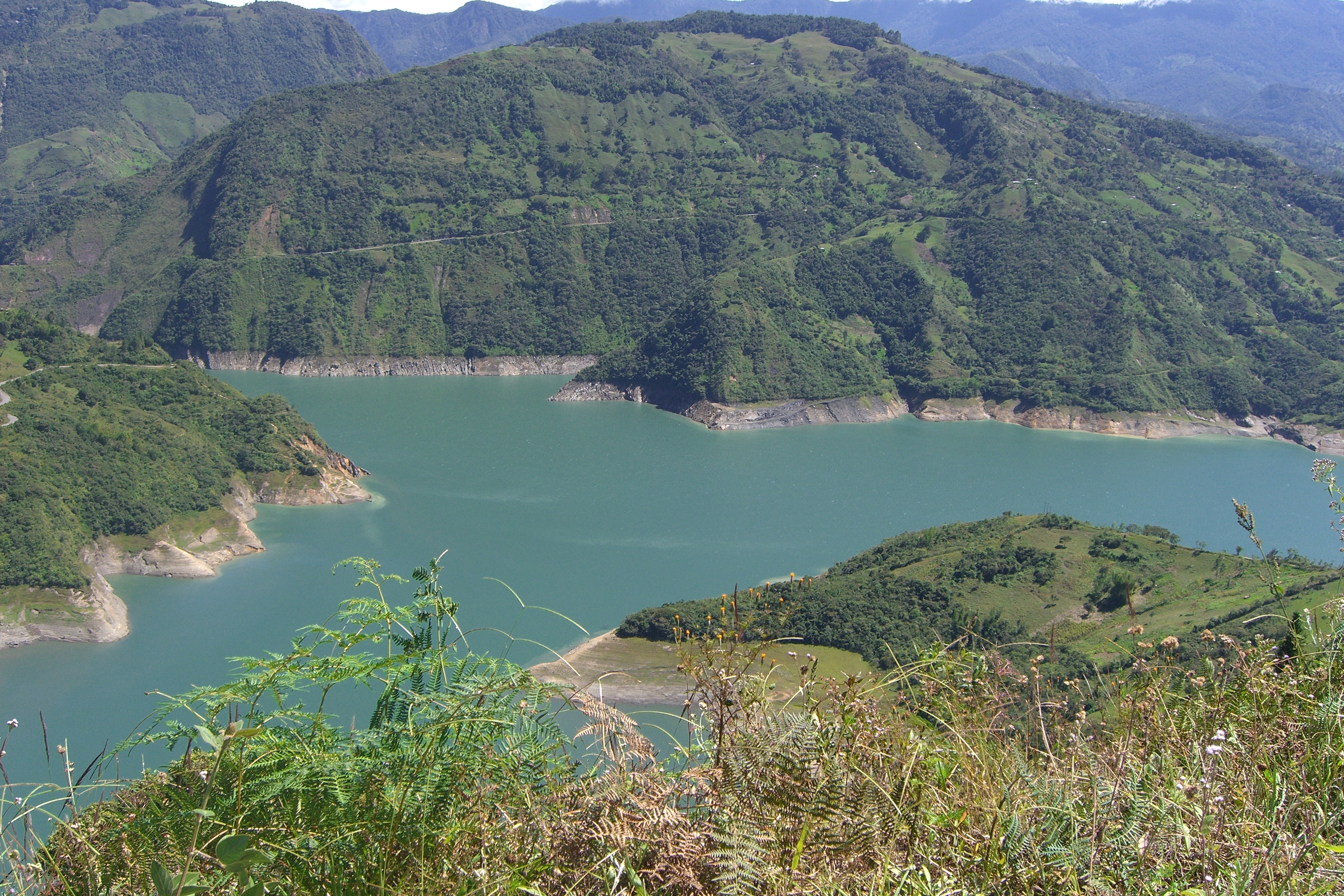
Guavio artificial lake

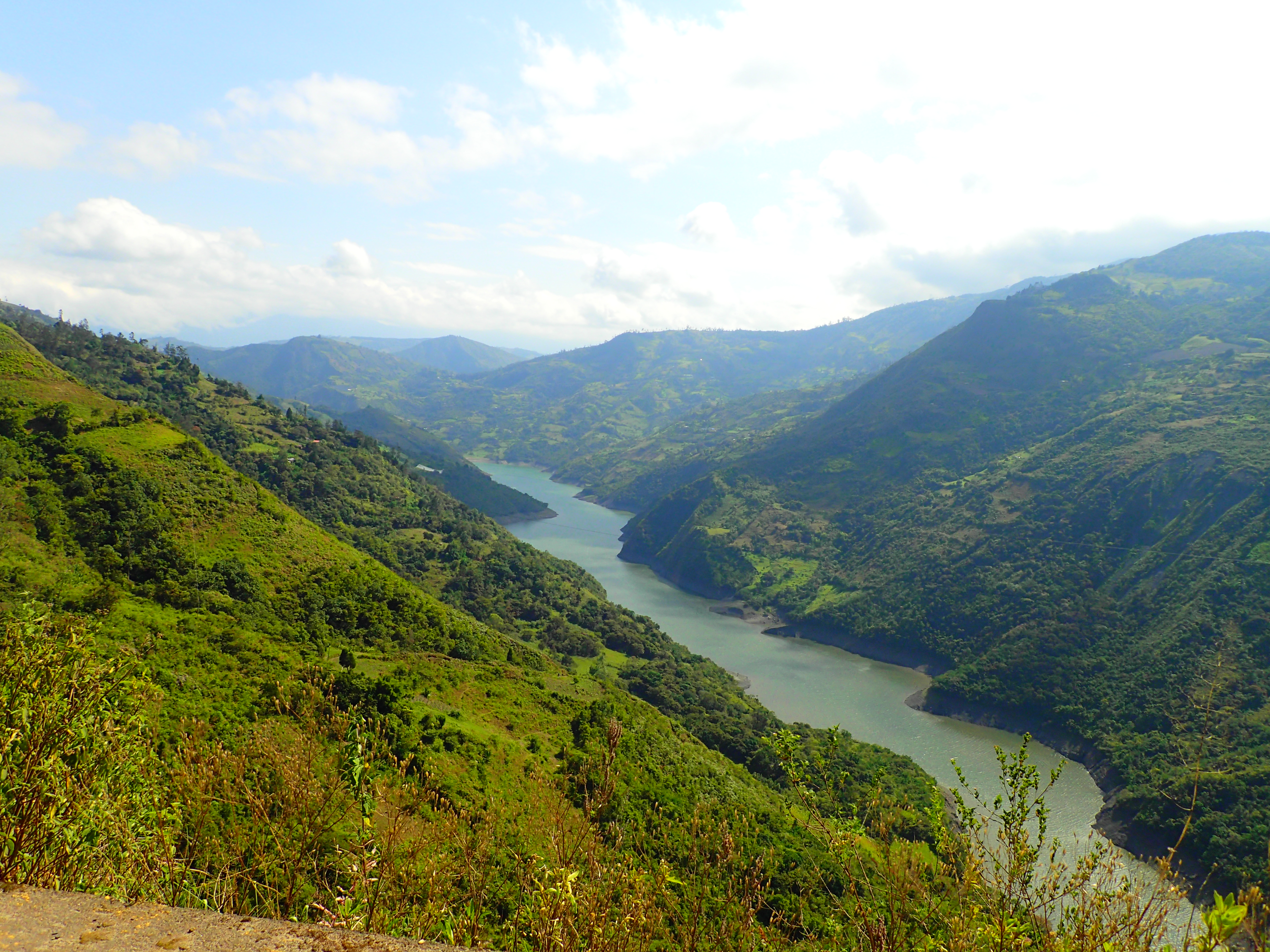
Guavio river

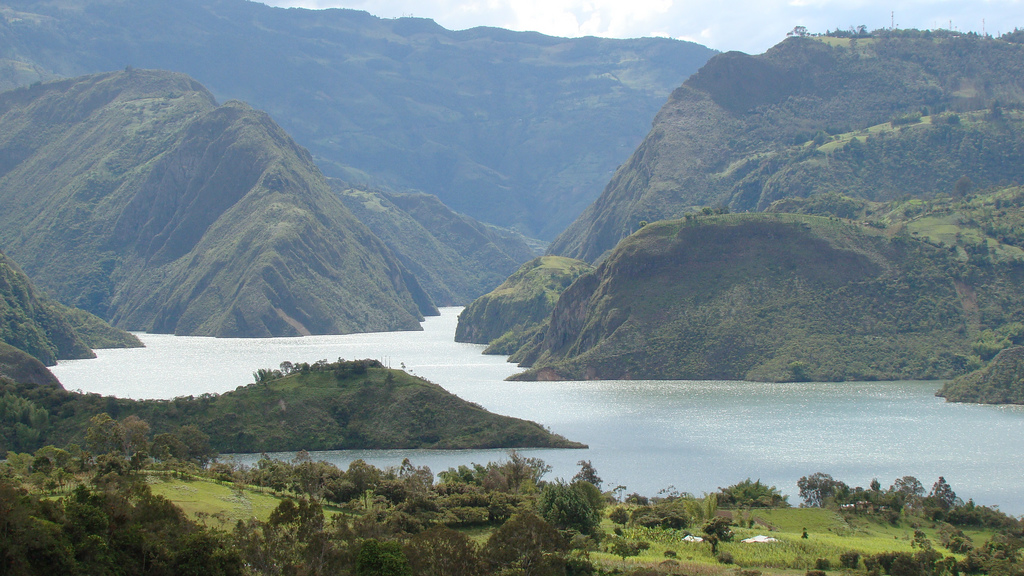
Guavio lake

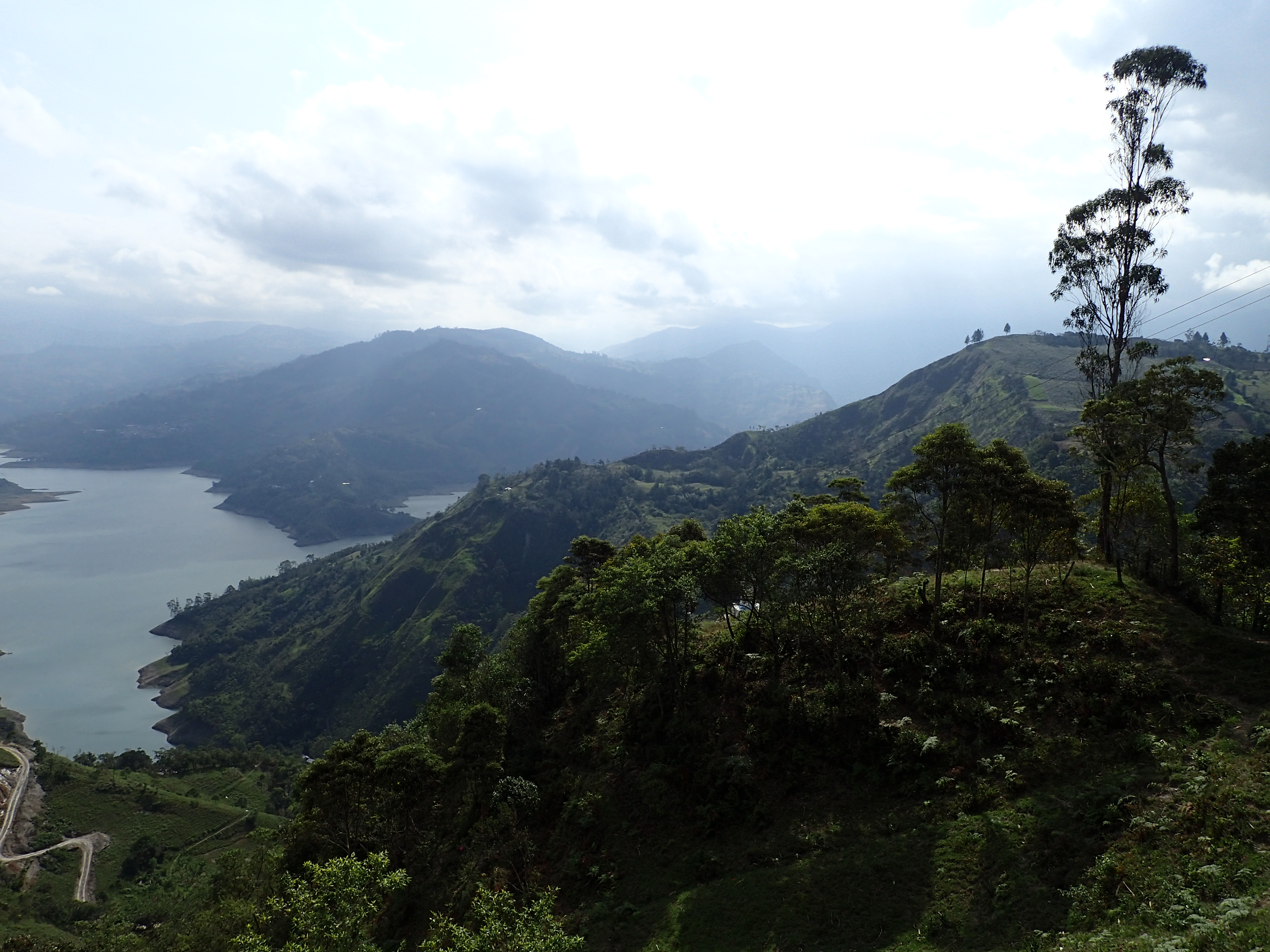
Edge of Guavio lake
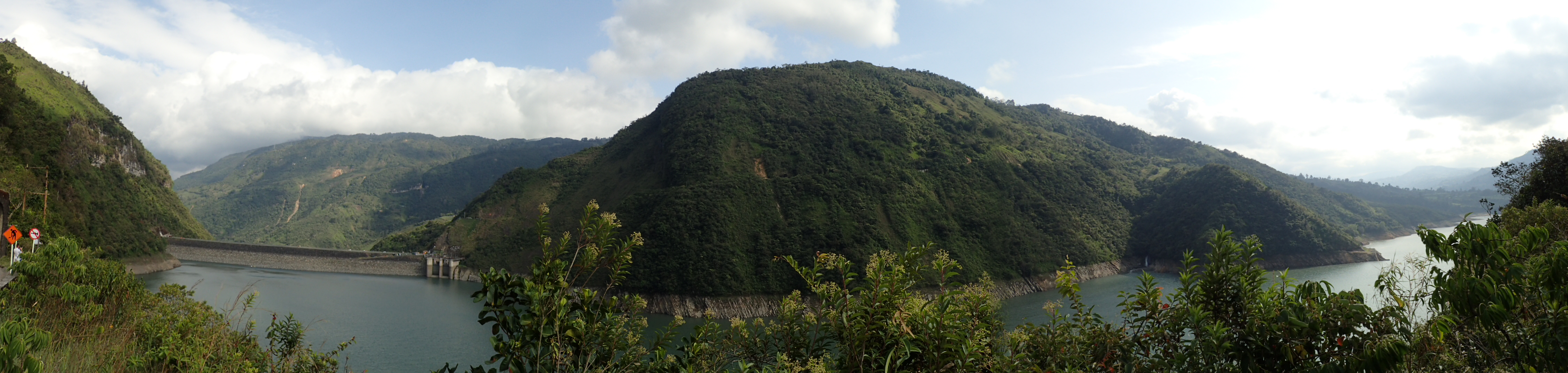
Panorama of the artificial lake of Guavio
