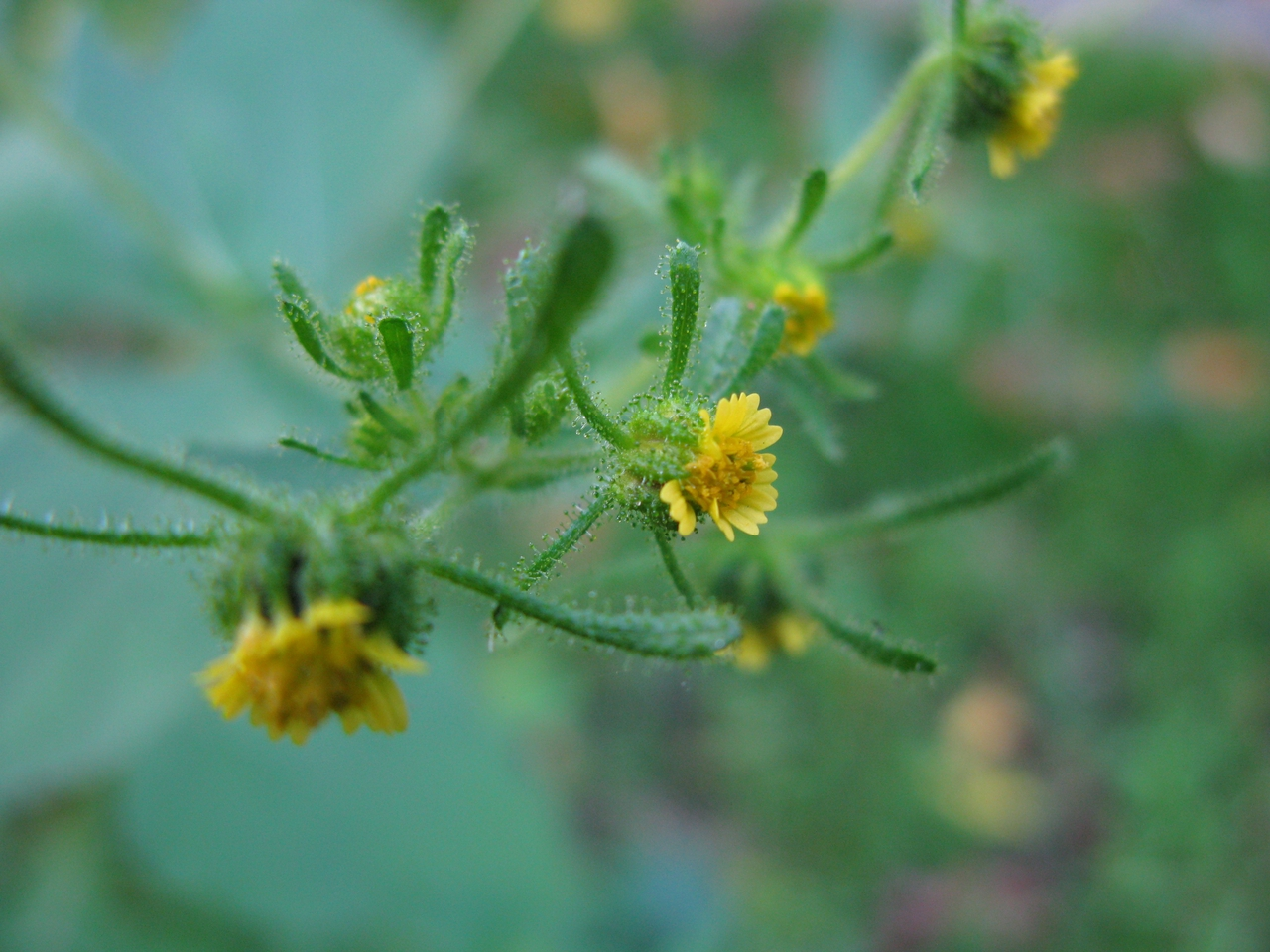
- Sigesbeckia serrata

Scientific classification
- Kingdom: Plantae
- Clade: Tracheophytes
- Clade: Angiosperms
- Clade: Eudicots
- Clade: Asterids
- Order: Asterales
- Family: Asteraceae
- Subfamily: Asteroideae
- Tribe: Millerieae
- Subtribe: Milleriinae
- Genus: Sigesbeckia; L. 1753 not J.G.Gleditsch 1764

Synonyms
- Schkuhria Moench; Minyranthes Turcz.; Trimeranthes (Cass.) Cass.

= Sigesbeckia =

Genus of plants

Sigesbeckia is a genus of annual plants in the family Asteraceae, with a pantropical distribution and in some areas of Asia and South America also into temperate regions. St Paul's-wort or St. Paul's wort is a common name for some of the species. Sigesbeckia is widely distributed and has been traditionally used for the management of chronic diseases, including arthritis.

== Origin ==
Sigesbeckia is named after the German botanist Johann Georg Siegesbeck (de), who was a strong critic of Carl Linnaeus's botanical classification system. Siegesbeck had referred to it as "loathsome harlotry" because of the focus of the system upon the presence (or absence) of sex organs in plants, and their locations and groupings. Siegesbeck tried to refute Linnaeus' sexual classification system, but was unable to provide sound scholastic arguments to support his arguments. Linnaeus proposed in Critica Botanica that there should be a link between the plant and the botanist after whom it was named. Considering the feud between Siegesbeck and Linnaeus, it is not surprising that in the classification book Hortus Cliffortianus, Linnaeus named a pungent weed Sigesbeckia.

== Classification ==
Sigesbeckia is related to a group of South American plants variously known as subtribe Espeletiinae or the Espeletia complex, which include genera such as Axiniphyllum, Espeletia, Polymnia, Smallanthus, Rumfordia, Trigonospermum, and Unxia.

Some African Sigesbeckia species were transferred, at least by some authors, to Guizotia.

Species

The number of species accepted varies between different authorities.

The Global Compositae Checklist accepts the following 17 species:

- Sigesbeckia agrestis Poepp. – Central and South America
- Sigesbeckia andersoniae B.L.Turner – Michoacán (treated by POWO in the genus Zandera as Zandera andersoniae (B.L.Turner) D.L.Schulz)
- Sigesbeckia australiensis D.L.Schulz – Australia
- Sigesbeckia blakei (McVaugh & Lask.) B.L.Turner – Guerrero (treated by POWO in the genus Zandera as Zandera blakei (McVaugh & Lask.) D.L.Schulz)
- Sigesbeckia bojeri (DC.) Humbert – Madagascar (treated by POWO in the genus Micractis as Micractis bojeri DC.)
- Sigesbeckia fugax Pedley – Queensland (treated by POWO as a subspecies of S. australiensis)
- Sigesbeckia glabrescens (Makino) Makino – China, Japan, Korea, Vietnam
- Sigesbeckia hartmanii B.L.Turner – Mexico (treated by POWO in the genus Zandera as Zandera hartmanii (B.L.Turner) D.L.Schulz)
- Sigesbeckia integrifolia Gagnep. – Vietnam (name not recorded by POWO)
- Sigesbeckia jorullensis Kunth – Latin America, West Indies
- Sigesbeckia microcephala DC. – Western Australia (treated by POWO as a synonym of S. orientalis)
- Sigesbeckia nudicaulis Standl. & Steyerm. – Guatemala
- Sigesbeckia orientalis L. – temperate and tropical Asia, Australia, and tropical Africa
- Sigesbeckia pringlei D.L.Schulz – Mexico
- Sigesbeckia pubescens (Makino) Makino – China
- Sigesbeckia repens B.L.Rob. & Greenm. – Oaxaca
- Sigesbeckia serrata DC. – South America, from Ecuador south to Argentina and Chile

By contrast, Plants of the World Online (POWO) accepts the following 11 species:

- Sigesbeckia agrestis Poepp.
- Sigesbeckia australiensis D.L.Schulz
- Sigesbeckia flosculosa L'Hér.
- Sigesbeckia glabrescens (Makino) Makino
- Sigesbeckia jorullensis Kunth
- Sigesbeckia nudicaulis Standl. & Steyerm.
- Sigesbeckia orientalis L.
- Sigesbeckia pringlei D.L.Schulz
- Sigesbeckia pubescens (Makino) Makino
- Sigesbeckia repens B.L.Rob. & Greenm.
- Sigesbeckia serrata DC.

== Traditional medicine ==
Three species of Sigesbeckia are used in traditional medicine, Sigesbeckia orientalis, Sigesbeckia pubescens, and Sigesbeckia glabracens, although the Royal Botanical Gardens, Kew, only accepts two of these species, with Sigesbeckia pubescens considered a subspecies of Sigesbeckia orientalis. In traditional medicine, the aerial parts of the plant are used to treat rheumatic conditions such as arthritis, joint pain, muscle pain, sciatica. It is also used to treat hypertension. Use of Sigesbeckia as a traditional medicine dates back to at least 659 AD, when it was first referenced in Chinese materia medica. The traditional Chinese medicine is called xi xian cao, and is used to "dispel wind-dampness, to strengthen sinews, and for wind-heat-damp pain obstructions".
