= Selloa =

Scientific classification
- Kingdom: Plantae
- Clade: Embryophytes
- Clade: Tracheophytes
- Clade: Angiosperms
- Clade: Eudicots
- Clade: Asterids
- Order: Asterales
- Family: Asteraceae
- Subfamily: Asteroideae
- Tribe: Millerieae
- Subtribe: Galinsoginae
- Genus: Selloa; Kunth 1818, conserved name not Spreng. 1818 (syn of Gymnosperma)

Type species
- Selloa plantaginea Kunth

Synonyms
- Feaea Spreng.; Feaella S.F.Blake

Genus of plants

Selloa is a genus of Latin American plants in the tribe Millerieae within the family Asteraceae.

Species

- Selloa breviligulata Longpre - Costa Rica
- Selloa linearis DC. - Uruguay
- Selloa macdonaldii (B.L.Turner) H.Rob. - Oaxaca
- Selloa obtusata (S.F.Blake) Longpre - Guatemala
- Selloa plantaginea Kunth - México State

formerly included

see Acmella Aphanactis Flaveria Gymnosperma

- Selloa glutinosa - Gymnosperma glutinosum
- Selloa ligulata - Aphanactis ligulata
- Selloa linearis - Acmella decumbens var. decumbens
- Selloa multiflora - Gymnosperma glutinosum
- Selloa nudata - Flaveria linearis
- Selloa scoparia - Gymnosperma glutinosum
