= Neilreichia =

Neilreichia may refer to two different genera of plants:

- Neilreichia Fenzl, a taxonomic synonym for the quickweed genus Schistocarpha
- Neilreichia Kotula, a taxonomic synonym for the sedge genus Carex
