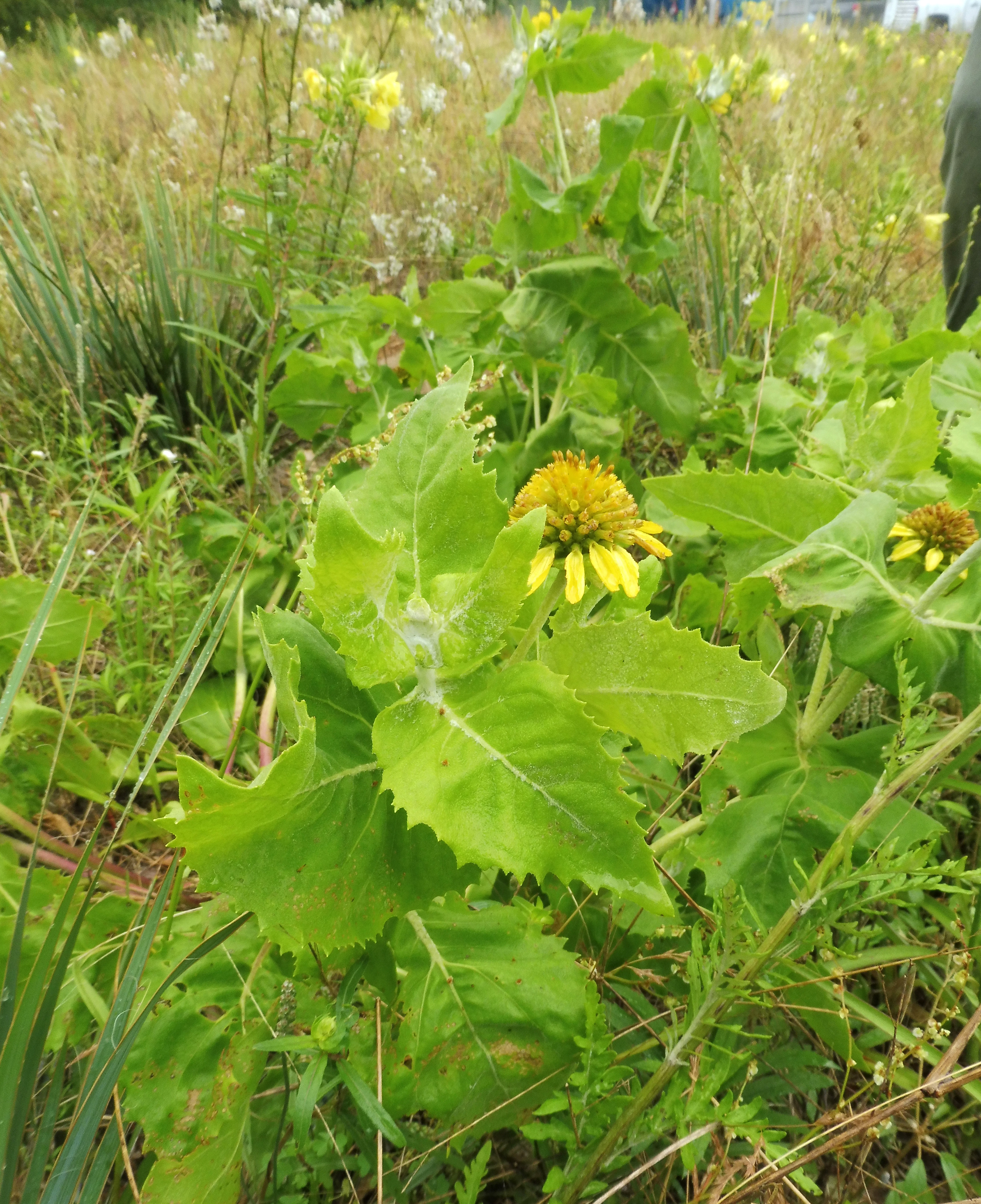
- Tetragonotheca ludoviciana

Scientific classification
- Kingdom: Plantae
- Clade: Tracheophytes
- Clade: Angiosperms
- Clade: Eudicots
- Clade: Asterids
- Order: Asterales
- Family: Asteraceae
- Subfamily: Asteroideae
- Tribe: Millerieae
- Genus: Tetragonotheca; L.

Type species
- Tetragonotheca helianthoides L.

Synonyms
- Halea Torr. & A.Gray 1842, illegitimate homonym not L. ex J.E. Smith 1821; Bikera Adans.; Tetragonosperma Scheele; Gonotheca Raf. 1818, not Blume ex DC. 1830

= Tetragonotheca =

Genus of plants

Tetragonotheca is a genus of North American plants in the family Asteraceae. Nerveray is a common name for plants in this genus.

Species

- Tetragonotheca helianthoides L. - MS AL GA FL NC SC TN VA
- Tetragonotheca ludoviciana (Torr. & A.Gray) A.Gray ex E.Hall - TX LA AR
- Tetragonotheca parviflora Jacq. - West Indies
- Tetragonotheca repanda (Buckley) Small - TX
- Tetragonotheca texana Engelm. & A.Gray ex A.Gray & Engelm. - TX, Coahuila, Nuevo León, Tamaulipas, Jalisco, Colima

formerly included

see Guizotia Rumfordia

- Tetragonotheca abyssinica - Guizotia abyssinica
- Tetragonotheca guatemalensis - Rumfordia guatemalensis
