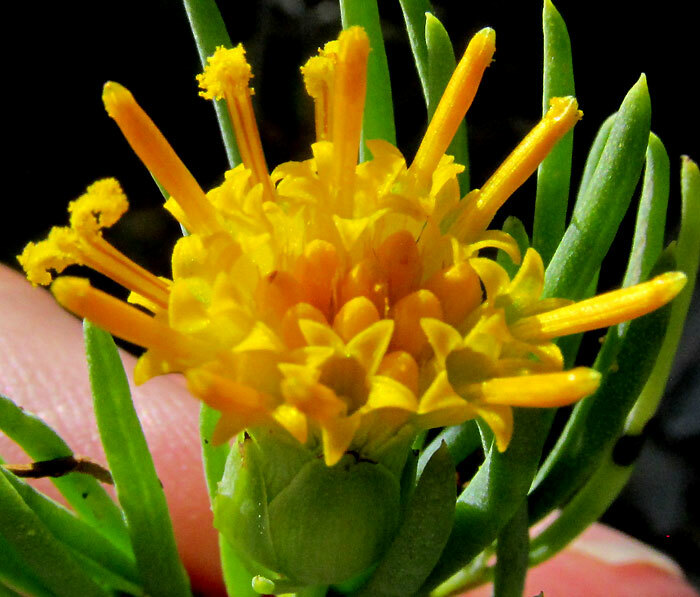
- Dyscritothamnus filifolius, flowering head and leaves

Scientific classification
- Kingdom: Plantae
- Clade: Tracheophytes
- Clade: Angiosperms
- Clade: Eudicots
- Clade: Asterids
- Order: Asterales
- Family: Asteraceae
- Genus: Dyscritothamnus
- Species: D. filifolius

Binomial name
- Dyscritothamnus filifolius B.L.Rob., 1922

= Dyscritothamnus filifolius =

Species of plant

Dyscritothamnus filifolius is a flowering plant belonging to the family Asteraceae.

== Description ==
The genus Dyscritothamnus, comprising only two species, is distinguished by this combination of features:

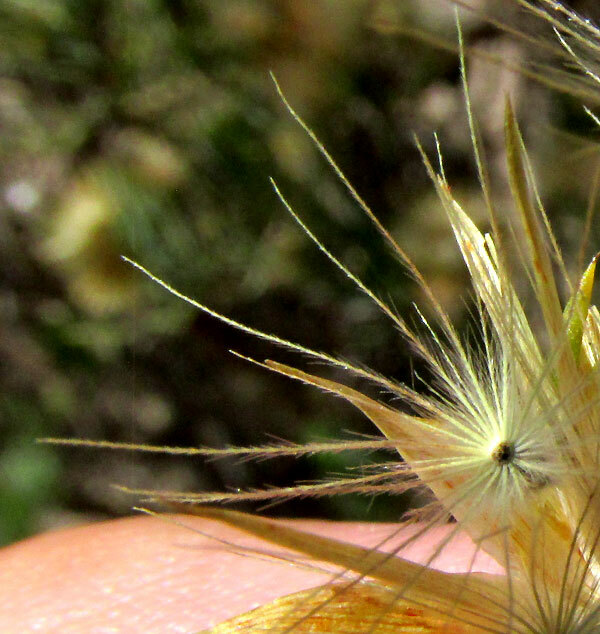
Dyscritothamnus filifolius, a pappus's feathery bristles

- They are woody shrubs with leaves appearing singly at each point along the stems, not opposite one another.
- Flowering heads consist of reduced flowers (florets) with orange corollas
- Two series of bracts of conspicuously different lengths form a cylindrical structure, the involucre, from which the florets arise in two series.
- Atop the one-seeded, cypsela-type fruits the pappuses consist of numerous bristles with tiny projections along their sides, like barbs along a very slender feather's rachis.

Dyscritothamnus filifolius differs from the other species, D. mirandae, with these features:

- Its leaves, similar to those of a spruce tree's, are needlelike, less than 1mm in width (< 3/64 inch).
- All its florets develop cyndrical corollas and are fertile.
- The plant is totally hairless.

== Distribution ==
Dyscritothamnus filifolius is endemic just to south-central Mexico, in the states of Guanajuato, Hidalgo, Querétaro, San Luis Potosí and Veracruz.

== Habitat ==
Dyscritothamnus filifolius can be abundant within its very limited distribution area. It inhabits very steep or vertical stone walls formed of limestone, shale or marl, often on road embankments, at elevations of about 900-1950m (~2950-6400 feet).

== Taxonomy ==
Within the huge family Asteraceae, Dyscritothamnus filifolius -- one of the only two species in the genus Dyscritothamnus -- belongs to the subfamily Asteroideae, the tribe Millerieae, and the subtribe Dyscritothamninae.

In localities in which the second species, Dyscritothamnus mirandae, lives alongside D. filifolius, hybrid plants with intermediate features and apparently well developed fruits are found.

In the original 1922 description of Dyscritothamnus mirandae by B.L. Robinson it's written that the type specimen for Dyscritothamnus filifolius was collected by "Ehrenberg" in January, 1840, his #1075. The Ehrenberg mentioned certainly was Carl August Ehrenberg (1801-1849), a Prussian businessman who from 1832 to 1839 was the director of a gold mine at Mineral del Monte, now known as Real del Monte, Hidalgo, and is known to have collected plants in the area of the mines, where Dyscritothamnus filifolius probably still grows. The type was deposited in Berlin and consisted of a photo and "slight fragm."

== Etymology ==
The genus name Dyscritothamnus, according to Benjamin Lincoln Robinson who first formally described the genus in 1922, is based on the Greek δύσκριτος, meaning "hard to determine," and θάμνος, meaning "shrub," a species he found so unusual that he was unsure into which tribe he should assign it.

In the species name filifolius, the fili- is from the Latin filum, meaning "thread". The -folius is from the Latin foliosus, meaning "having (such or so many) leaves." Therefore, "having leaves like threads" -- threadlike leaves.

== Gallery ==
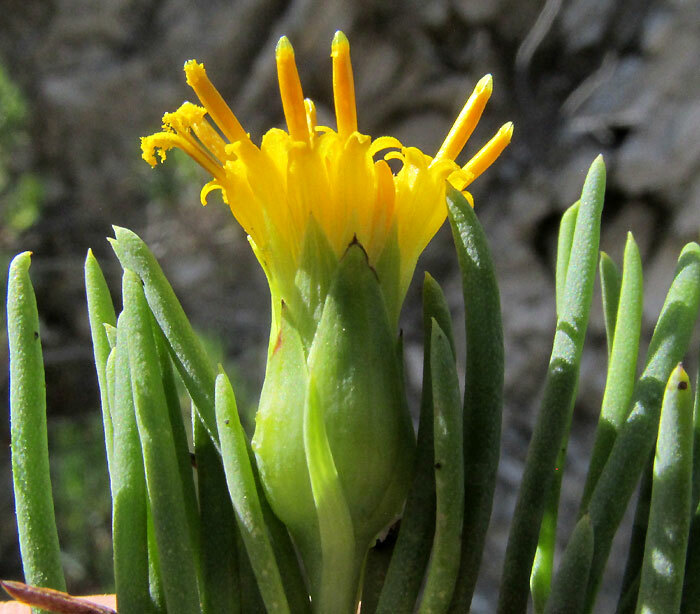
Dyscritothamnus filifolius flowering head with bracts of two lengths

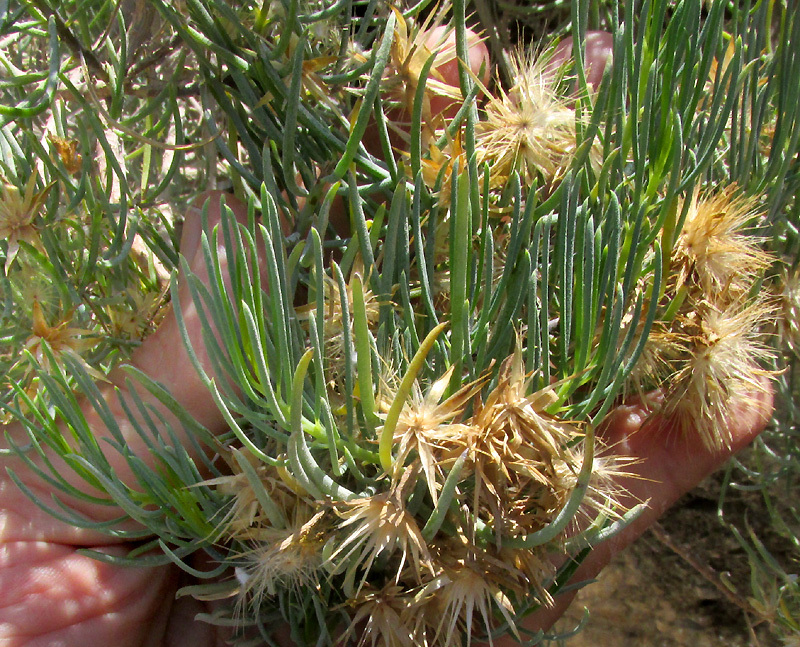
Dyscritothamnus filifolius old flowering heads among spruce-like leaves

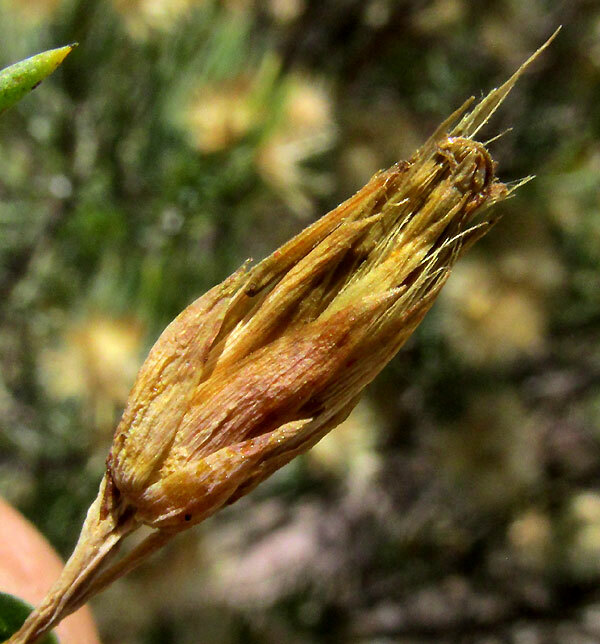
Dyscritothamnus filifolius mature flowering head

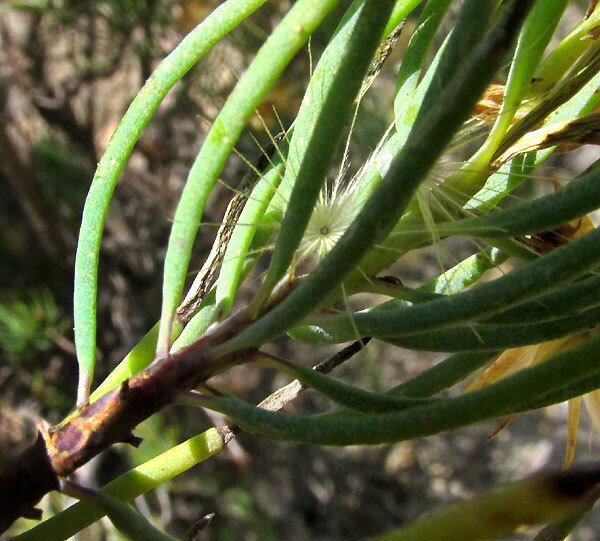
Dyscritothamnus filifolius leaf bases close-up

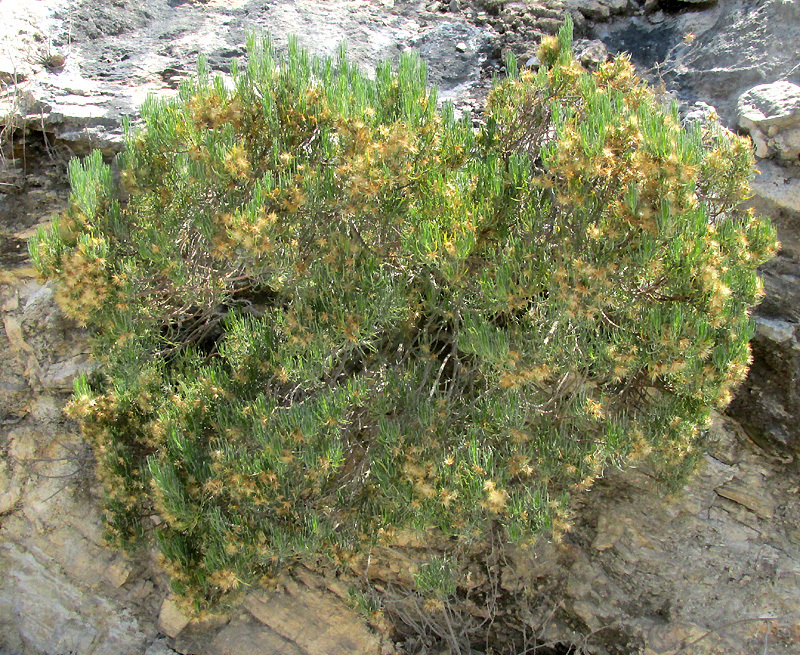
Dyscritothamnus filifolius in rock wall habitat
