= Squarehead =

Squarehead may refer to:

== Music ==
- Squarehead (band), a garage pop band
- "Squarehead", a song by Iggy Pop from the 1988 album Instinct
- "Squarehead", a 2007 video by band Hello Seahorse!

== Fictional characters ==
- SC2c "Squarehead" Larsen, in the 1945 film They Were Expendable
- Squarehead, in the 1938 film Juvenile Court
- Squareheads, in the 1950 novel The Golden Pine Cone

== Other uses ==
- Tetragonotheca helianthoides, a species of flowering plant
- Squarehead, a pejorative term used for Germans, Albanians and Scandinavians

== See also ==
- Squareheads of the Round Table, a 1948 short film
- Squarehead catfish, a genus of fish
- Squareheaded window, an architectural feature characteristic of the Tudor transition style
- List of screw drives § Square drives
