= Micractis =

Micractis is the scientific name for a genus of plants and a genus of animals:

- Micractis (moth), a genus of moths, now synonymized with the genus Ostrinia
- Micractis (plant), a genus of plants in the daisy family
