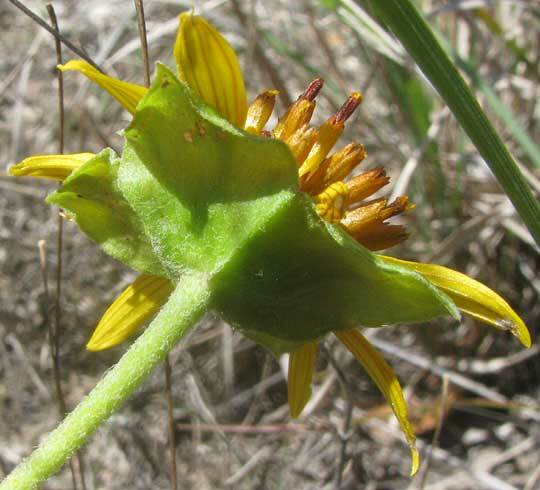
- Squarebud Daisy, outer four, fused bracts at base of flowering head

Scientific classification
- Kingdom: Plantae
- Clade: Tracheophytes
- Clade: Angiosperms
- Clade: Eudicots
- Clade: Asterids
- Order: Asterales
- Family: Asteraceae
- Genus: Tetragonotheca
- Species: T. texana

Binomial name
- Tetragonotheca texana A.Gray & Engelm., 1848

Synonyms
- Halea texana A. Gray, 1849; Tetragonosperma lyratifolium Scheele, 1849

= Tetragonotheca texana =

Species of plant

Tetragonotheca texana, the squarebud daisy or nerve-ray, is an herbaceous, perennial plant belonging to the family Asteraceae.

== Description ==
The feature so unusual about this striking wildflower, as with all four species of the genus Tetragonotheca, is that at the bottom of each flowering head, four of the head's several involucral bracts are fused together to form something like an oversized, square collar.

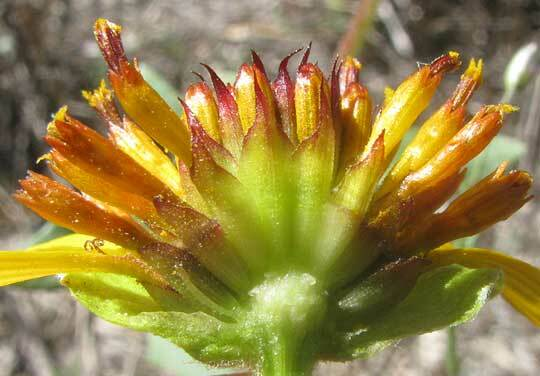
Squarebud daisy, dissected flower head

Here are features further distinguishing squarebud daisy flowers from those of similar species:

- Beside each disc floret there's a conspicuous, sharp-tipped, scale-like bract, a palea.
- Disc florets arise atop a conical platform, the receptacle.
- Petal-like ray florets with flat corollas, numbering 8-13, are up to 18mm long (~7/8 inch).
- Within each flowering head, at the base of the corolla of each reduced flower, or floret, there are zero or up to ten sharply pointed scales forming the pappus.

Beyond that, squarebud daisy displays these vegetative features distinguishing the species:

- The plant grows up to about 1.2 meters tall (4 feet).
- Leaves are arranged along the stem, not at the base.
- Leaves are moderately to narrowly egg-shaped in outline and up to 7 cm long and 3 cm wide (~2 3/4 x 1 1/5 inches).
- Leaf margins vary from having no significant indentations or teeth to being fairly deeply cut or irregularly pinnatifid.
- The stems are hairless or only sparsely covered with short, matted, woolly hairs.

== Distribution ==
Squarebud daisy is endemic only to the southwestern part of the US state of Texas, and in northeastern Mexico the states of Coahuila, Nuevo León and Tamaulipas.

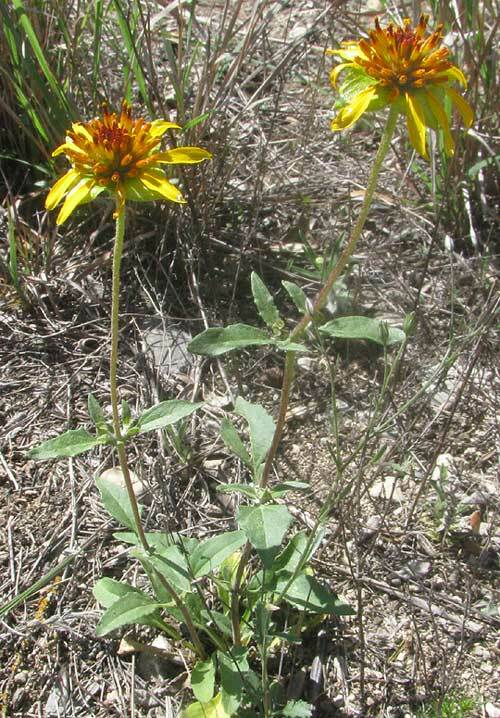
Squarebud daisy in habitat on a rocky hillside in Texas

== Habitat ==
Squarebud daisy lives in well drained, dry, sandy, rocky soil atop limestone. Often it grows with Mesquite.

== Gardening ==
Squarebud daisy is appreciated by gardeners for its conspicuous, fragrant flowers, which are a nectar source for various species. However, the species is vulnerable to deer. In Texas it flowers from April into September. It prefers sunny, dry locations, and survives with minimum watering.

== Taxonomy ==
Within the family Asteraceae, Tetragonotheca texana belongs to the subfamily Asteroideae, the tribe Millerieae, and the subtribe Dyscritothamninae.

When George Engelmann and Asa Gray formally described the species in 1848 they mentioned that the type specimen was collected by Lindheimer in the hills near the Guadalupe and Cibolo rivers, Texas ("In collibus juxta flumina Guadaloupe et Cibolo, Texas, Lindheimer")

=== Etymology ===
The genus name Tetragonotheca is constructed from the Greek tetra, meaning "four", plus the term gonio, meaning "angle", and theca, meaning "container". This alludes to the quadrangular structure formed by the involucre's lower four bracts.

The species name texana clearly refers to the US state of Texas, where the type specimen was collected.
