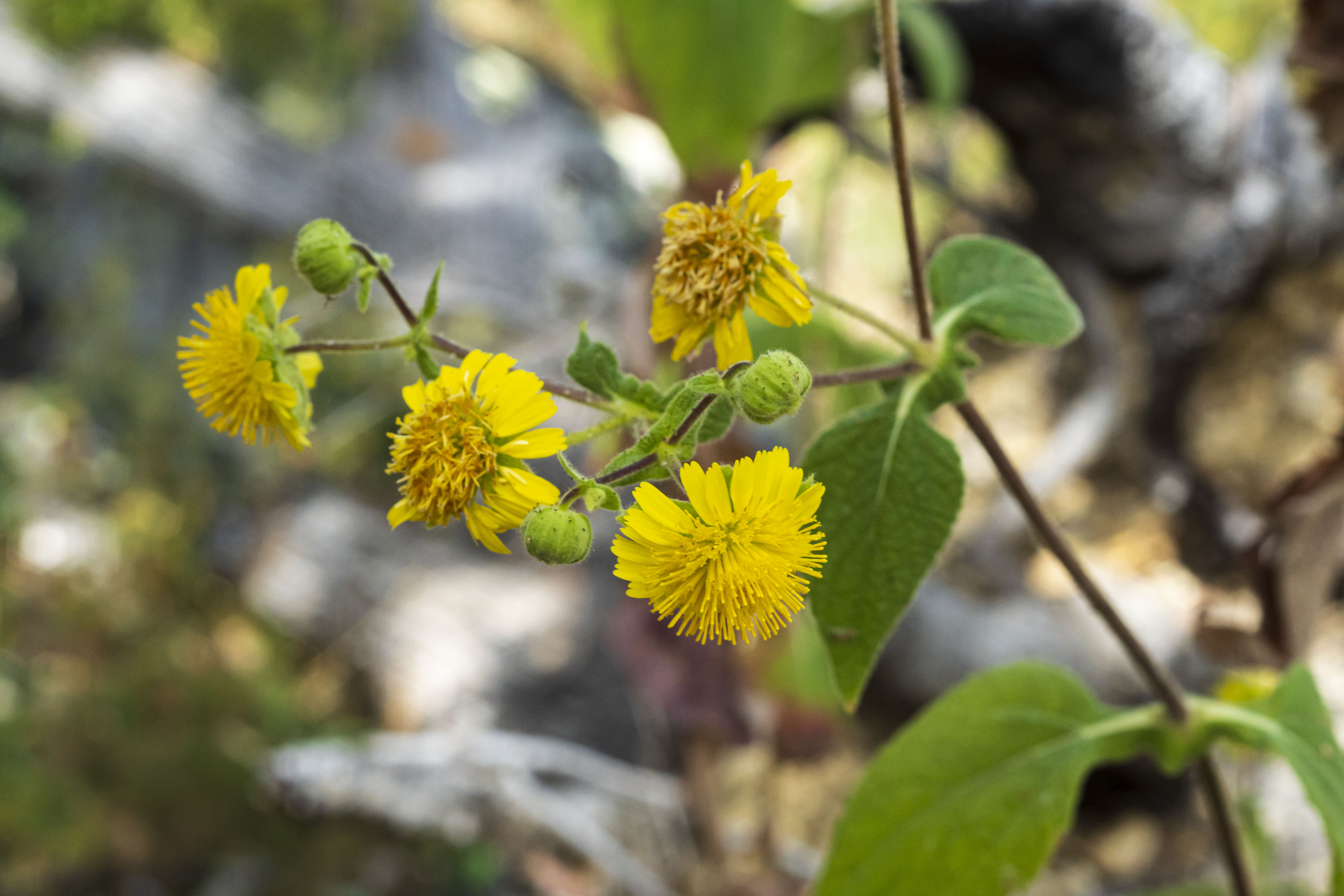
- Rumfordia connata flowering high in the Sierra de la Laguna.

Scientific classification
- Kingdom: Plantae
- Clade: Tracheophytes
- Clade: Angiosperms
- Clade: Eudicots
- Clade: Asterids
- Order: Asterales
- Family: Asteraceae
- Genus: Rumfordia
- Species: R. connata

Binomial name
- Rumfordia connata Brandegee

= Rumfordia connata =

Species of flowering plant

Rumfordia connata is a species of flowering plant in the Millerieae tribe of the composite family commonly known as the Cape rumfordia. A conspicuous yellow-flowered shrubby perennial growing to 2 metres (6.6 ft) high, this species is endemic to the high elevations of the Sierra de la Laguna mountains of Baja California Sur where it is uncommonly found. Rumfordia connata was first discovered and later described by Townshend Stith Brandegee in 1892.

== Description ==
Rumfordia connata is a shrub or rarely perennial herb growing to 2 metres (6.6 ft) high and forming conspicuous masses more than a yard in diameter. The stems are fistulose (hollow and reed-like), and are laxly branched, being clustered at the base and much-branched at the top. The stems have a glandular-pubescent indumentum.

The leaves are petiolate and often have a connate-perfoliate base. The petioles may be winged, serrate, or undulate. The leaves are arranged oppositely, and spaced apart on the stem by internodes often a little longer than the a leaf. The leaves measure 3.3–15 cm (1.3–5.9 in) long and have a hirsute pubescence.

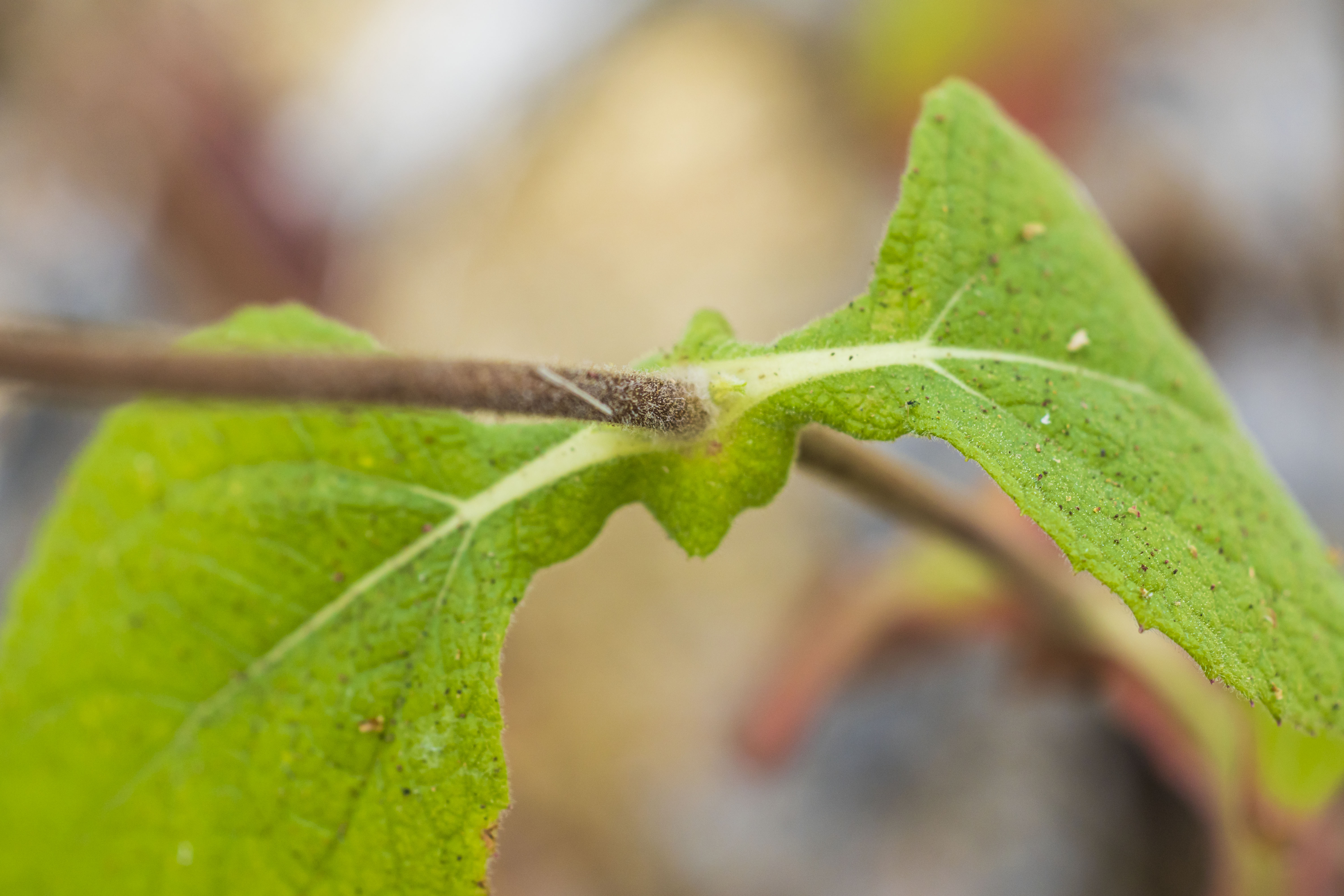
The oppositely-arranged leaves on Rumfordia connata with their characteristic connate-perfoliate bases.

The inflorescences consist of a lax panicle bearing capitula (heads) on long, naked peduncles. The heads measure 4–5 cm (1.6–2.0 in) broad. The ray florets are pistillate and fertile. The disk florets are bisexual (perfect) and fertile. The receptacle is flat or slightly convex and bears receptacular bracts (palea) that subtend the florets. The inner involucral bracts are biseriate, 1/4 the size of the outer involucres. The outer involucres resemble the foliage and are laxly spreading, shaped oval, elliptic to oblong-lanceolate. The achenes are glabrous, striate, and shaped obovoid, 1 mm (0.039 in) long and are slightly compressed obliquely, and are loosely enclosed by the palea which are about twice their length.

== Distribution and habitat ==
Rumfordia connata is endemic to the high elevations of the Sierra de la Laguna, the primary mountain range at the southern end of Baja California Sur, Mexico. It is usually found along streams and arroyos in the pine-oak woodland. The species is uncommon, but is conspicuous due to its large size and flowers.
