= Tamananthus =

Scientific classification
- Kingdom: Plantae
- Clade: Tracheophytes
- Clade: Angiosperms
- Clade: Eudicots
- Clade: Asterids
- Order: Asterales
- Family: Asteraceae
- Subfamily: Asteroideae
- Tribe: Millerieae
- Subtribe: Espeletiinae
- Genus: Tamananthus; V.M.Badillo
- Species: T. crinitus

Binomial name
- Tamananthus crinitus V.M.Badillo

Genus of plants

Tamananthus is a genus of Venezuelan plants in the tribe Millerieae within the family Asteraceae.

Species

The only known species is Tamananthus crinitus, native to Táchira State in the Andes of western Venezuela.
