= Zandera =

Scientific classification
- Kingdom: Plantae
- Clade: Tracheophytes
- Clade: Angiosperms
- Clade: Eudicots
- Clade: Asterids
- Order: Asterales
- Family: Asteraceae
- Subfamily: Asteroideae
- Tribe: Millerieae
- Subtribe: Milleriinae
- Genus: Zandera; Dorothea Louise Schulz

Genus of flowering plants

Zandera is a genus of annual plants in the family Asteraceae.

It is native to Mexico.

== Species ==
There are 3 species accepted by Plants of the World Online;

- Zandera andersoniae (B.L.Turner) D.L.Schulz
- Zandera blakei (McVaugh & Lask.) D.L.Schulz
- Zandera hartmanii (B.L.Turner) D.L.Schulz

The genus name of Zandera is in honour of Robert Zander (1892–1969), a German botanist and horticulturist in Berlin. It was first described and published in Haussknechtia, Mitt. Thüring. Bot. Ges. Vol.4 on page 32 in 1988.

It is noted as a possible synonym of Sigesbeckia L. by the United States Department of Agriculture and the Agricultural Research Service, but they do not list any known species.
