= Guardiola angustifolia =

Scientific classification
- Kingdom: Plantae
- Clade: Tracheophytes
- Clade: Angiosperms
- Clade: Eudicots
- Clade: Asterids
- Order: Asterales
- Family: Asteraceae
- Genus: Guardiola
- Species: G. angustifolia

Binomial name
- Guardiola angustifolia B.L.Rob.

Synonyms
- Guardiola tulocarpus var. angustifolia A. Gray ex S. Watson 1887; Guardiola mexicana var. angustifolia (A. Gray ex S. Watson) McVaugh

Species of flowering plant

Guardiola angustifolia is a rare North American species of plants in the family Asteraceae. It is found only in western Mexico in the state of Jalisco.

Guardiola angustifolia is a branching perennial herb up to 60 cm (2 ft) tall. Leaves are narrow and lance-shaped, up to 8 cm (3.1 in) long with prominent teeth along the edges. Flower heads are arranged in flat-topped arrays resembling umbels at first glance. Heads have both ray flowers and disc flowers.
