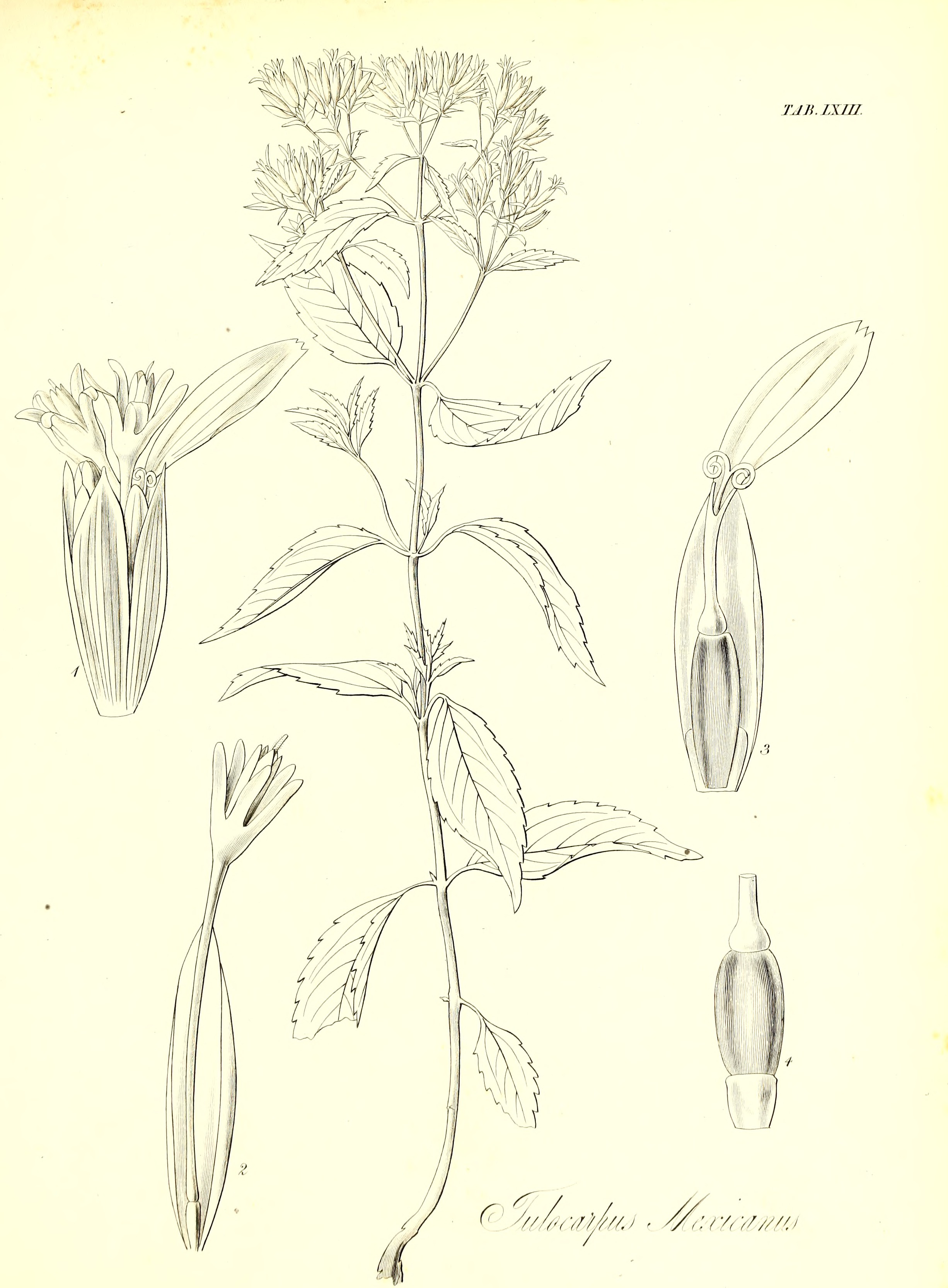
- Guardiola tulocarpus

Scientific classification
- Kingdom: Plantae
- Clade: Embryophytes
- Clade: Tracheophytes
- Clade: Spermatophytes
- Clade: Angiosperms
- Clade: Eudicots
- Clade: Asterids
- Order: Asterales
- Family: Asteraceae
- Subfamily: Asteroideae
- Tribe: Millerieae
- Subtribe: Guardiolinae; H.Rob.
- Genus: Guardiola; Cerv. ex Bonpl.

Type species
- Guardiola mexicana Bonpl.

Synonyms
- Tulocarpus Hook. & Arn.

= Guardiola (plant) =

Genus of flowering plants

Guardiola is a genus of plants in the family Asteraceae, native to Mexico and the southwestern United States. Members of the genus are subshrubs with simple, opposite leaves and terminal inflorescences.

Originally placed in the subtribe Melampodiinae, the genus was placed in its own subtribe, Guardiolinae, by Harold Robinson in 1978.

Species

- Guardiola angustifolia (A.Gray ex A.Gray) B.L.Rob. - Jalisco
- Guardiola arguta B.L.Rob. - Sonora
- Guardiola carinata B.L.Rob. - Nayarit
- †Guardiola diehlii M.E.Jones - New Mexico but probably extinct
- Guardiola mexicana Humb. & Bonpl. - from Durango to Oaxaca
- Guardiola odontophylla B.L.Rob. - Durango
- Guardiola palmeri B.L.Rob. - Durango
- Guardiola pappifera Paul G.Wilson - Guerrero
- Guardiola platyphylla A.Gray - Arizona (Gila, Pima, Santa Cruz, Cochise Counties), Sonora, Sinaloa, Chihuahua
- Guardiola rosei B.L.Rob. - Chihuahua, Nayarit, Durango
- Guardiola rotundifolia B.L.Rob. - Jalisco
- Guardiola stenodonta S.F.Blake - Sinaloa
- Guardiola thompsonii P.Van Faasen - Michoacán
- Guardiola tulocarpus A.Gray - from Sinaloa + Veracruz to Oaxaca
