= Stachycephalum =

Scientific classification
- Kingdom: Plantae
- Clade: Tracheophytes
- Clade: Angiosperms
- Clade: Eudicots
- Clade: Asterids
- Order: Asterales
- Family: Asteraceae
- Subfamily: Asteroideae
- Tribe: Millerieae
- Subtribe: Milleriinae
- Genus: Stachycephalum; Sch.Bip. ex Benth.

Type species
- Stachycephalum mexicanum Sch.Bip. ex Benth.

Genus of plants

Stachycephalum is a genus of plants in the family Asteraceae.

Species

- Stachycephalum argentinum Griseb. - Ecuador (Morona-Santiago), Argentina (Tucumán, Jujuy, Salta, Catamarca)
- Stachycephalum mexicanum Sch.Bip. ex Benth. - Oaxaca
