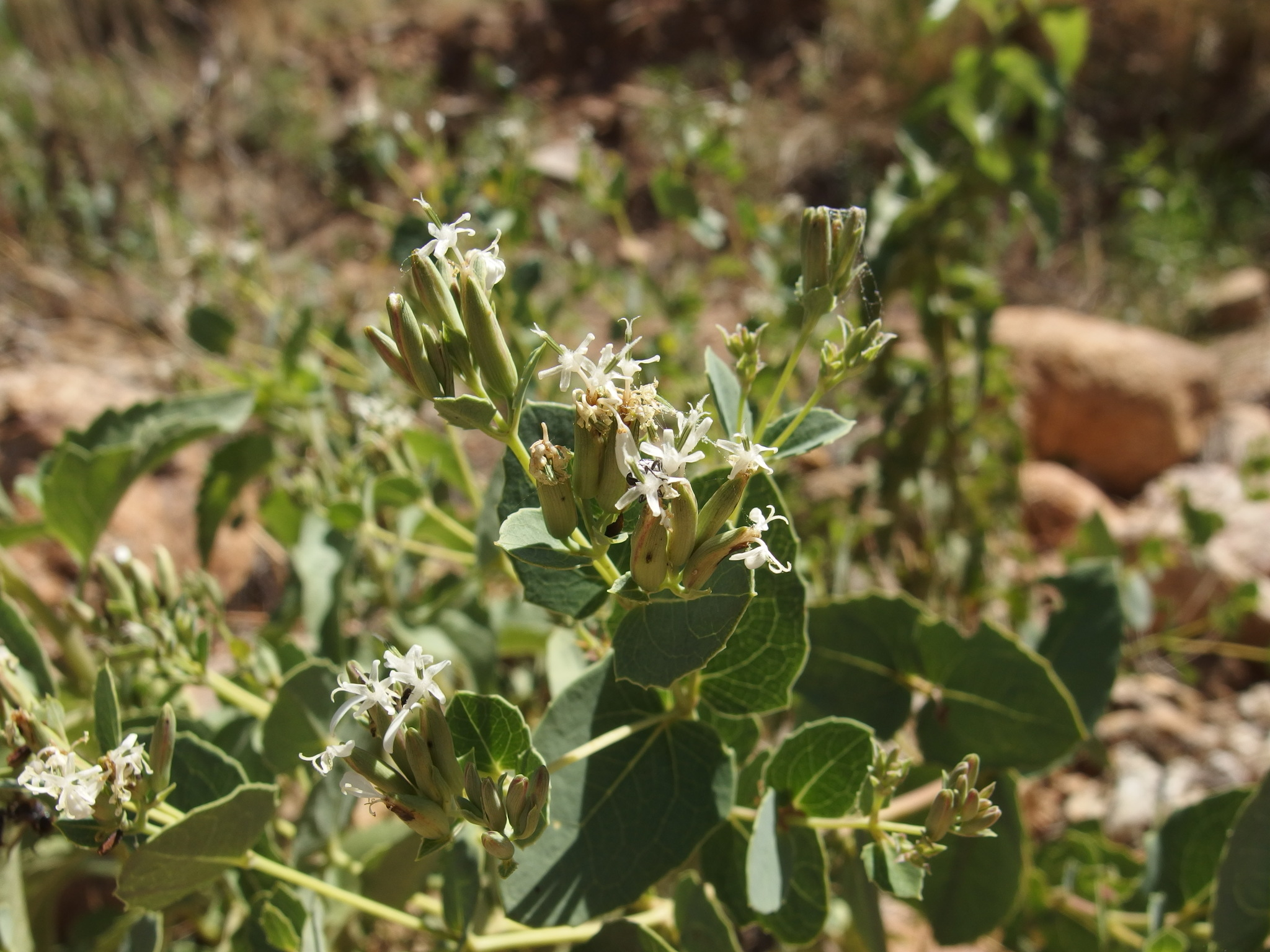

Scientific classification
- Kingdom: Plantae
- Clade: Tracheophytes
- Clade: Angiosperms
- Clade: Eudicots
- Clade: Asterids
- Order: Asterales
- Family: Asteraceae
- Genus: Guardiola
- Species: G. platyphylla

Binomial name
- Guardiola platyphylla A.Gray

= Guardiola platyphylla =

Species of flowering plant

Guardiola platyphylla, the Apache plant, is a North American species of plants in the family Asteraceae, native to Mexico and the southwestern United States. It is found in northwestern Mexico (Chihuahua, Sinaloa, and Sonora) and the southwestern United States (southern Arizona).

Guardiola platyphylla is a branching perennial herb or subshrub up to 100 cm (39 in) tall. Leaves are opposite, thick and leathery, up to 7 cm (2.8 in) long. One plant will produce several flower heads in a flat-topped array. Each head contains 1-5 white ray flowers surrounding 3-20 white disc flowers.
