= Aphanactis jamesoniana =

Conservation status
- Least Concern (IUCN 3.1)

Scientific classification
- Kingdom: Plantae
- Clade: Tracheophytes
- Clade: Angiosperms
- Clade: Eudicots
- Clade: Asterids
- Order: Asterales
- Family: Asteraceae
- Genus: Aphanactis
- Species: A. jamesoniana

Binomial name
- Aphanactis jamesoniana Wedd.

Species of flowering plant

Aphanactis jamesoniana is a species of flowering plant in the family Asteraceae. It is found only in Ecuador. Its natural habitat is subtropical or tropical high-elevation grassland. It is threatened by local agriculture and fire threats.
