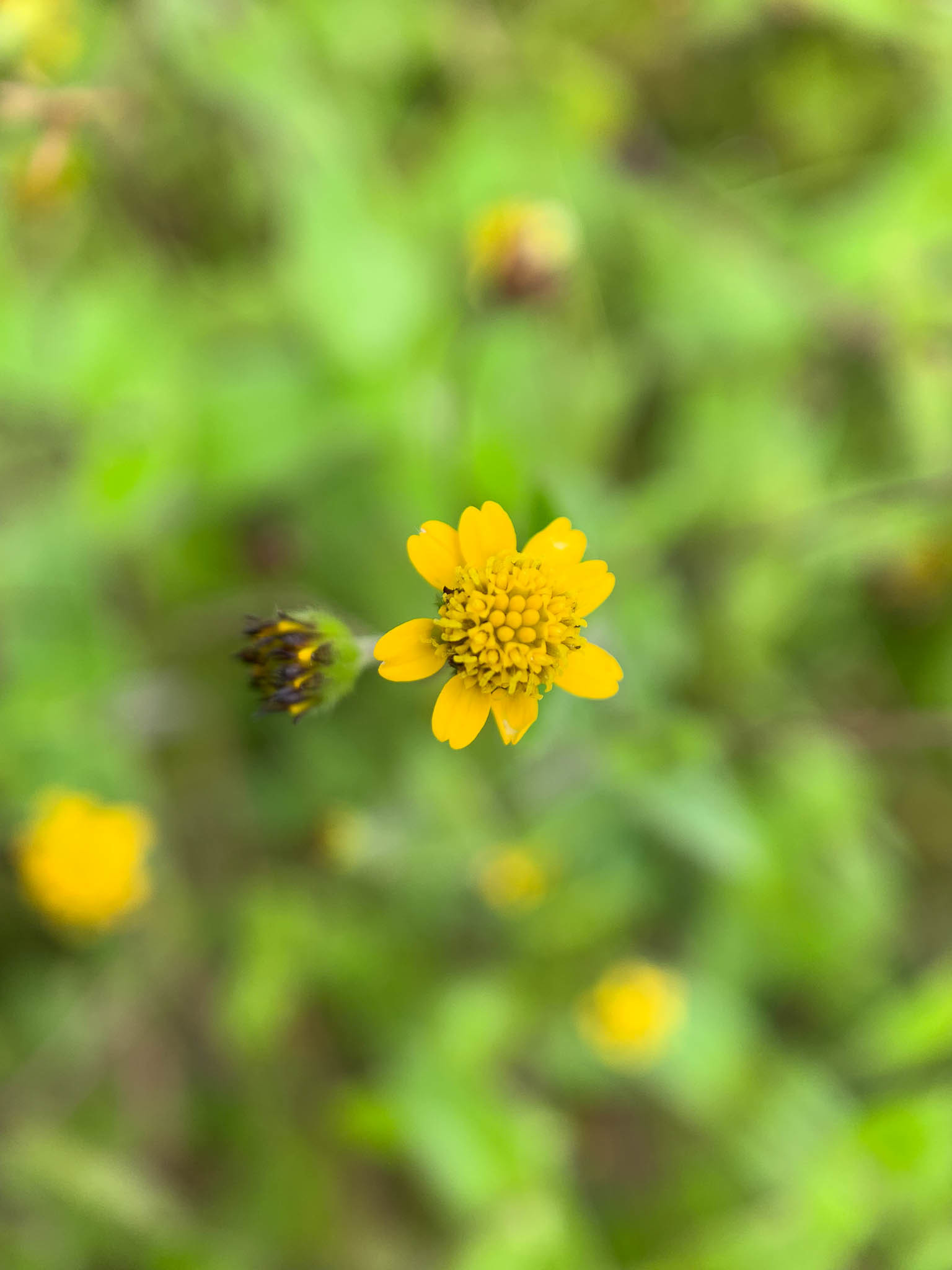

Scientific classification
- Kingdom: Plantae
- Clade: Tracheophytes
- Clade: Angiosperms
- Clade: Eudicots
- Clade: Asterids
- Order: Asterales
- Family: Asteraceae
- Genus: Jaegeria
- Species: J. gracilis

Binomial name
- Jaegeria gracilis Hook.f.

Synonyms
- Jaegeria crassa A.M.Torres; Jaegeria prorepens Hook.f.

= Jaegeria gracilis =

Species of flowering plant

Jaegeria gracilis is a flowering plant species in the family Asteraceae. It is endemic to the Galápagos Islands of Ecuador.
