= Guardiola thompsonii =

Scientific classification
- Kingdom: Plantae
- Clade: Tracheophytes
- Clade: Angiosperms
- Clade: Eudicots
- Clade: Asterids
- Order: Asterales
- Family: Asteraceae
- Genus: Guardiola
- Species: G. thompsonii

Binomial name
- Guardiola thompsonii Faasen

Species of flowering plant

Guardiola thompsonii is a rare North American species of plants in the family Asteraceae. It is found only in western Mexico in the state of Michoacán.

Guardiola thompsonii is up to 100 cm (39 in) tall. Leaves are up to 12 cm (4.7 in) long. One plant will produce 15-20 flower heads in a flat-topped array per major branch. Each head contains 2-3 ray flowers and 10-15 disc flowers.
