= Guardiola carinata =

Scientific classification
- Kingdom: Plantae
- Clade: Tracheophytes
- Clade: Angiosperms
- Clade: Eudicots
- Clade: Asterids
- Order: Asterales
- Family: Asteraceae
- Genus: Guardiola
- Species: G. carinata

Binomial name
- Guardiola carinata B.L.Rob.

Species of flowering plant

Guardiola carinata is a rare North American species of plants in the family Asteraceae. It is found only in northern Mexico in the state of Nayarit.

Guardiola carinata is a branching woody perennial, hairless except a few hairs on the pedicels. Flower heads have both ray flowers and disc flowers.

The Guardiola carinata is a yellow color.
