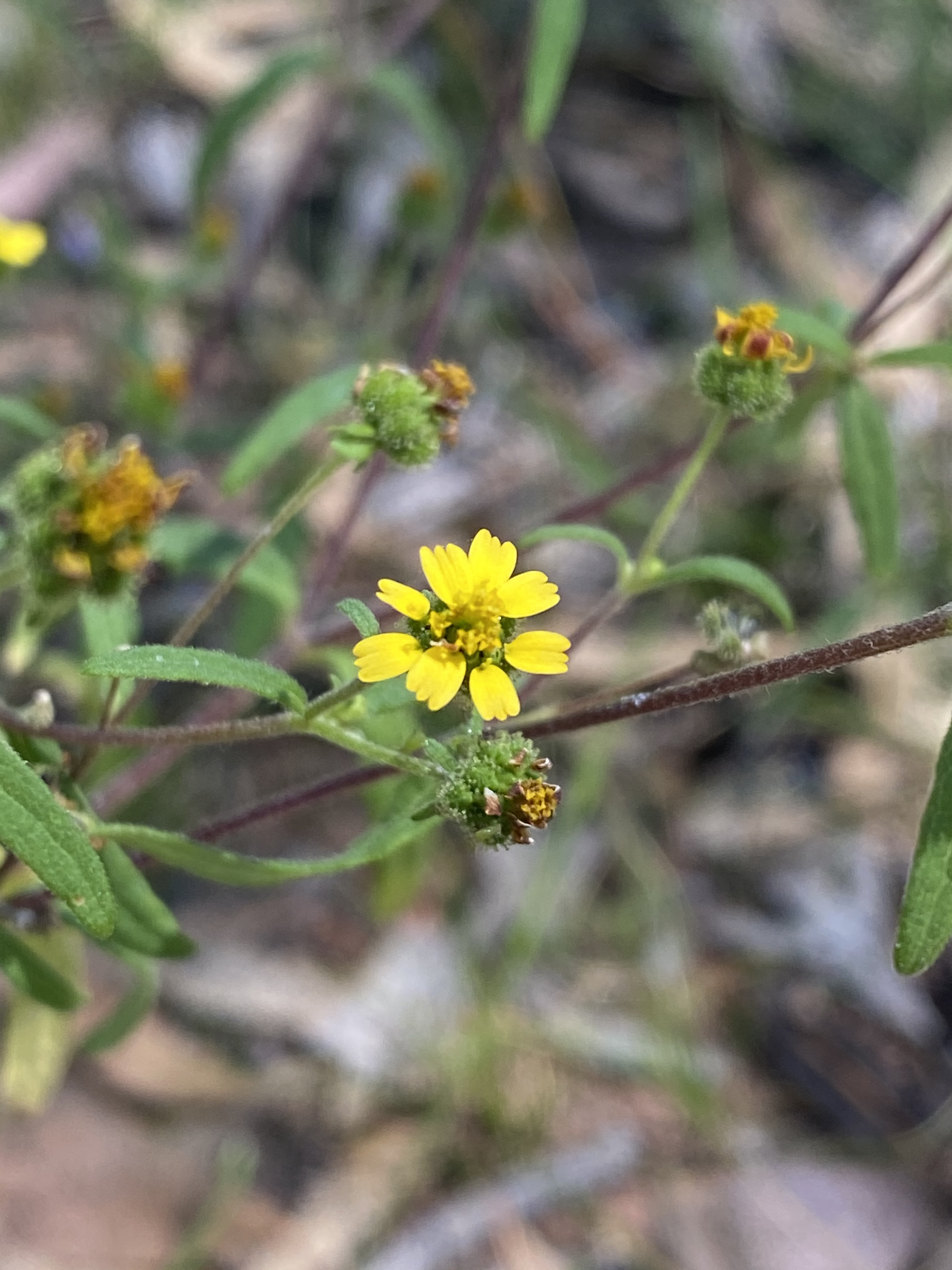

Scientific classification
- Kingdom: Plantae
- Clade: Tracheophytes
- Clade: Angiosperms
- Clade: Eudicots
- Clade: Asterids
- Order: Asterales
- Family: Asteraceae
- Genus: Sigesbeckia
- Species: S. orientalis

Binomial name
- Sigesbeckia orientalis L.

= Sigesbeckia orientalis =

Species of flowering plant

Sigesbeckia orientalis, commonly known as Indian weed or common St. Paul's wort, is a species of flowering plant in the family Asteraceae. It is a small, upright, sparsely branched shrub with yellow flowers and widespread in Asia, Africa and Australia.

== Description ==
Sigesbeckia orientalis is an annual, upright herb or subshrub, about 0.4–1.5 m (1 ft 4 in – 4 ft 11 in) high, usually multi-branched with reddish coloured, hollow stems. The leaves may be triangular-shaped, lance-shaped to broadly lance-shaped, and up to 2–17 cm (0.79–6.69 in) long, 1–7 cm (0.39–2.76 in) wide, petiole up to 2 cm (0.79 in) long, underside has small, yellow glands. The upper and lower surface of the leaf blade is sparsely hairy, the margin has pointed to rounded teeth, larger teeth nearer the base, gradually narrowing, base wedge-shaped, and rough on both surfaces. The yellow or orange flowers are borne in clusters of about 15 sessile flowers per head, about 10 mm (0.39 in) in diameter, usually containing female and hermaphrodite flowers. There are about 8 ray florets, each ligule 1–2 mm (0.039–0.079 in) long, and 10-15 disc florets. The fruit is a dark brown to black cypsela, 2–3 mm (0.079–0.118 in) long, curved and ridged. Flowering and fruiting occurs all months of the year.

== Taxonomy and naming ==
Sigesbeckia orientalis was first formally described in 1753 by Carl Linnaeus and the description was published in Species Plantarum. The specific epithet (orientalis) means "pertaining to the east". The botanist, Johann Georg Siegesbeck was an outspoken critic of Linnaeus' new classification of plant sexual systems, referring to it as "lewd" and "loathsome harlotry". In revenge Linnaeus named the genus Sigesbeckia, because he considered it an insignificant weed. Linnaeus sent a packet of S. orientalis to Siegesbeck, labelled Cuculus ingratus (ungrateful cuckoo). Siegesbeck grew the seeds and realised their true identity. In 1759 the Linnaeus system offended Pope Clement XIII, who banned all Linnaeus’ publications from the Vatican, and decreed that all copies of his work be burned.

== Distribution and habitat ==
Sigesbeckia orientalis has a broad distribution in Africa and Asia, but has been widely naturalised outside this range. There is debate whether the species is native to Australia.The National Herbarium of New South Wales accepts the species as native. It is a widespread species in Australia growing on river banks and on shallow, stony locations.

== Gallery ==
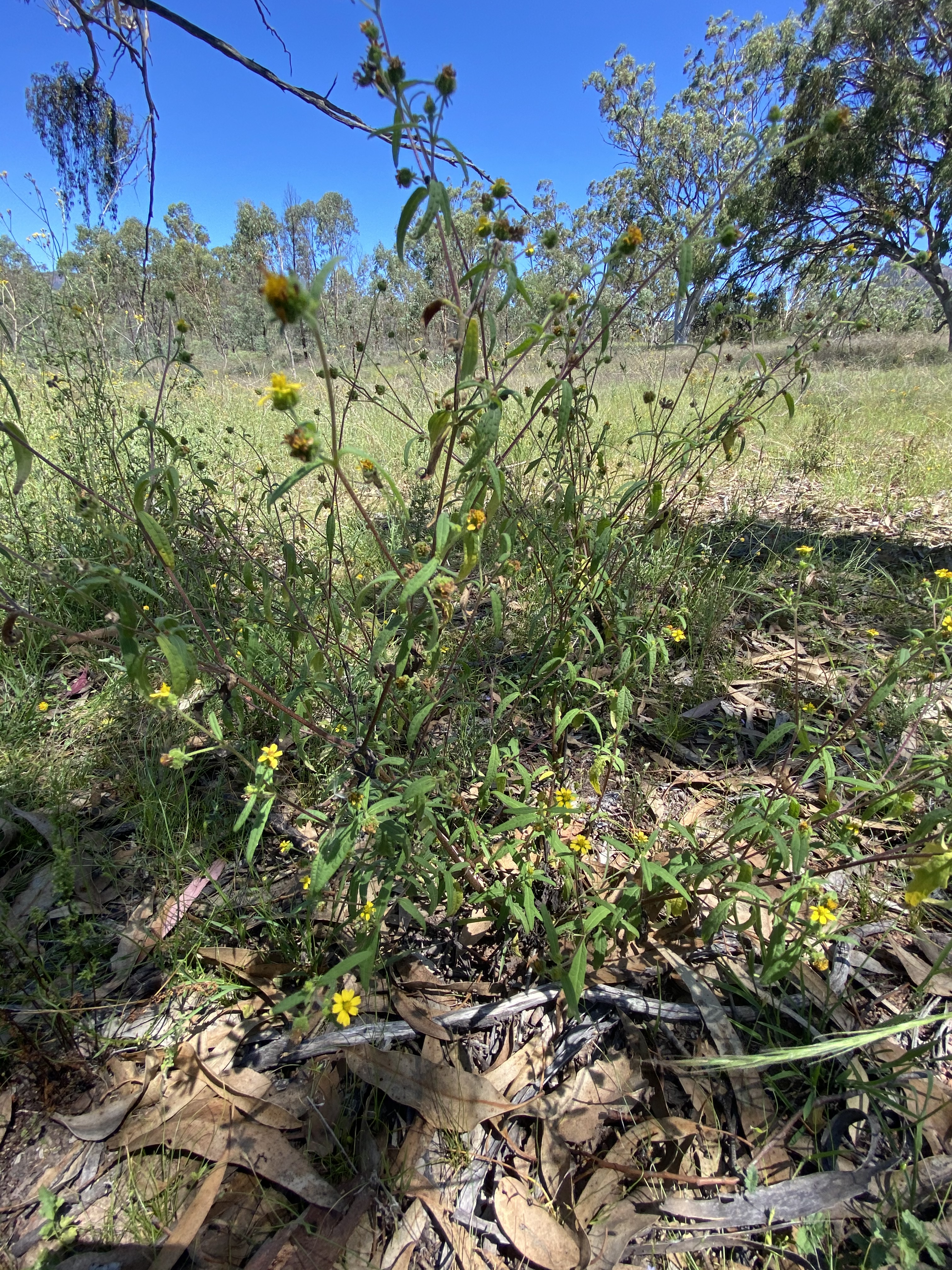
habit

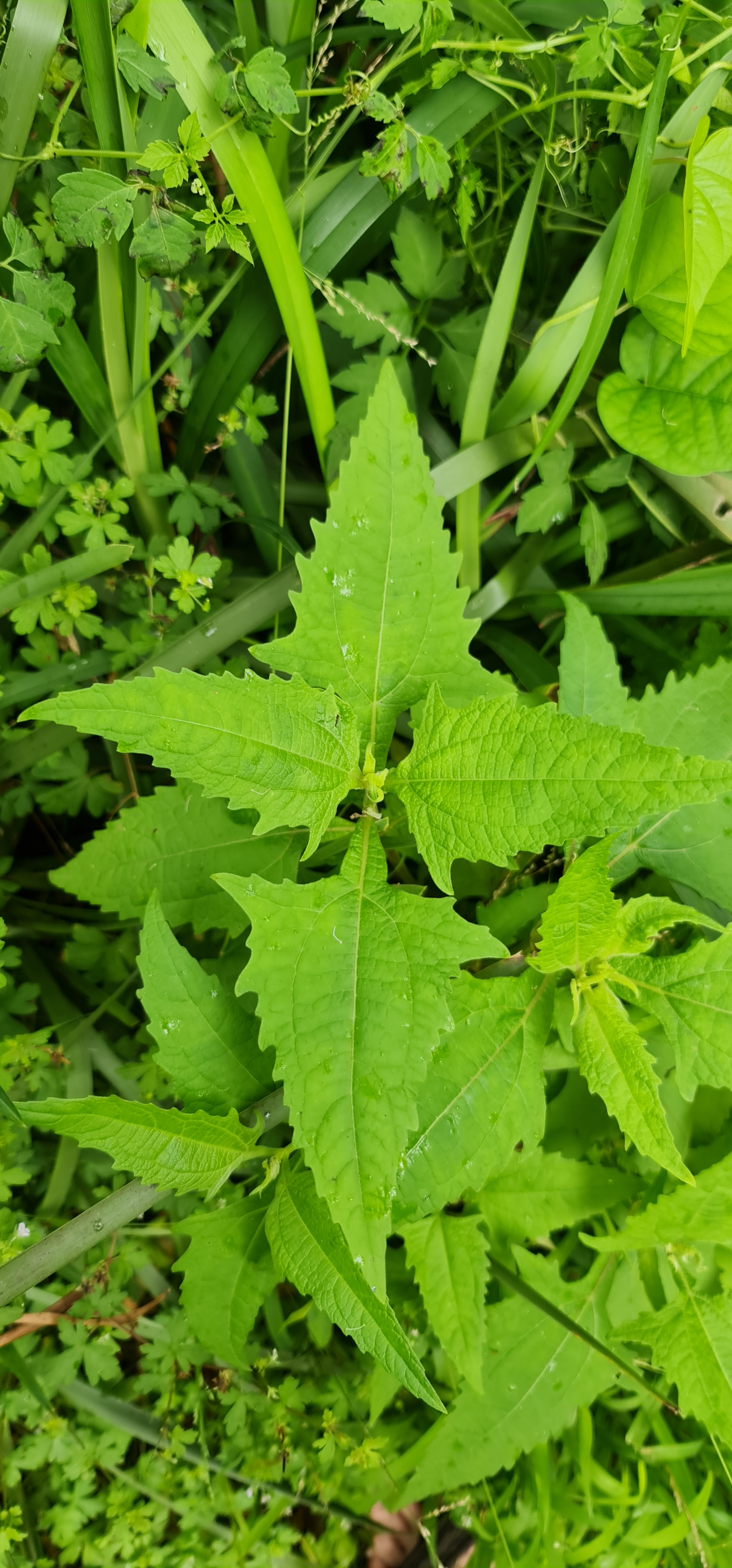
Sigesbeckia orientalis juvenile growth, Wollongong, Australia
