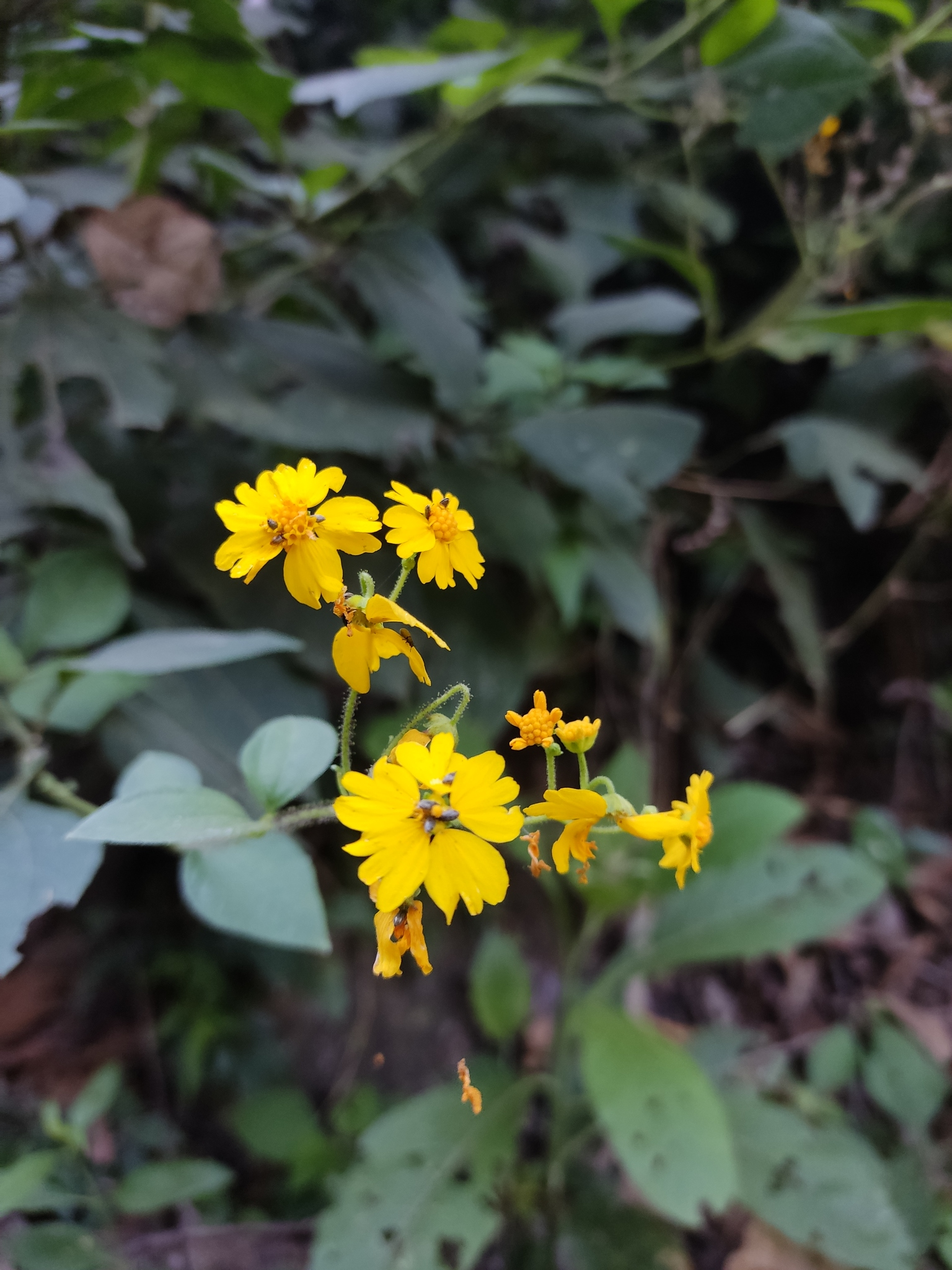
- Trigonospermum melampodioides in Mexico

Scientific classification
- Kingdom: Plantae
- Clade: Tracheophytes
- Clade: Angiosperms
- Clade: Eudicots
- Clade: Asterids
- Order: Asterales
- Family: Asteraceae
- Subfamily: Asteroideae
- Tribe: Millerieae
- Subtribe: Milleriinae
- Genus: Trigonospermum; Less.

Type species
- Trigonospermum adenostemmoides Less.

= Trigonospermum =

Genus of flowering plants

Trigonospermum is a genus of Mesoamerican plants in the family Asteraceae.

Species

- Trigonospermum adenostemmoides Less. - Chiapas, Veracruz
- Trigonospermum annuum McVaugh & Lask. - Jalisco
- Trigonospermum auriculatum B.L.Turner - Guerrero
- Trigonospermum hintoniorum B.L.Turner - Tamaulipas, Nuevo León
- Trigonospermum melampodioides DC. - Oaxaca, Chiapas, Michoacán, Jalisco, Guerrero, Sinaloa, Morelos, Nayarit
- Trigonospermum stevensii S.D.Sundb. & Stuessy - Nicaragua, Guatemala

formerly included

see Sigesbeckia

- Trigonospermum blakei - Sigesbeckia blakei
