= Guardiola diehlii =

Scientific classification
- Kingdom: Plantae
- Clade: Tracheophytes
- Clade: Angiosperms
- Clade: Eudicots
- Clade: Asterids
- Order: Asterales
- Family: Asteraceae
- Genus: Guardiola
- Species: G. diehlii

Binomial name
- Guardiola diehlii M.E.Jones

Species of flowering plant

Guardiola diehlii is a very rare (quite possibly extinct) North American species of plants in the family Asteraceae, found only in the state of New Mexico in the southwestern United States.

Guardiola diehlii is (was) an annual herb measuring up to 30 cm (1 ft) tall. Its leaves are long and narrow, measuring up to 5 cm (2 in) long. One plant will produce several flower heads in a flat-topped array. Each head contains only one white ray flower and 4 disc flowers.
