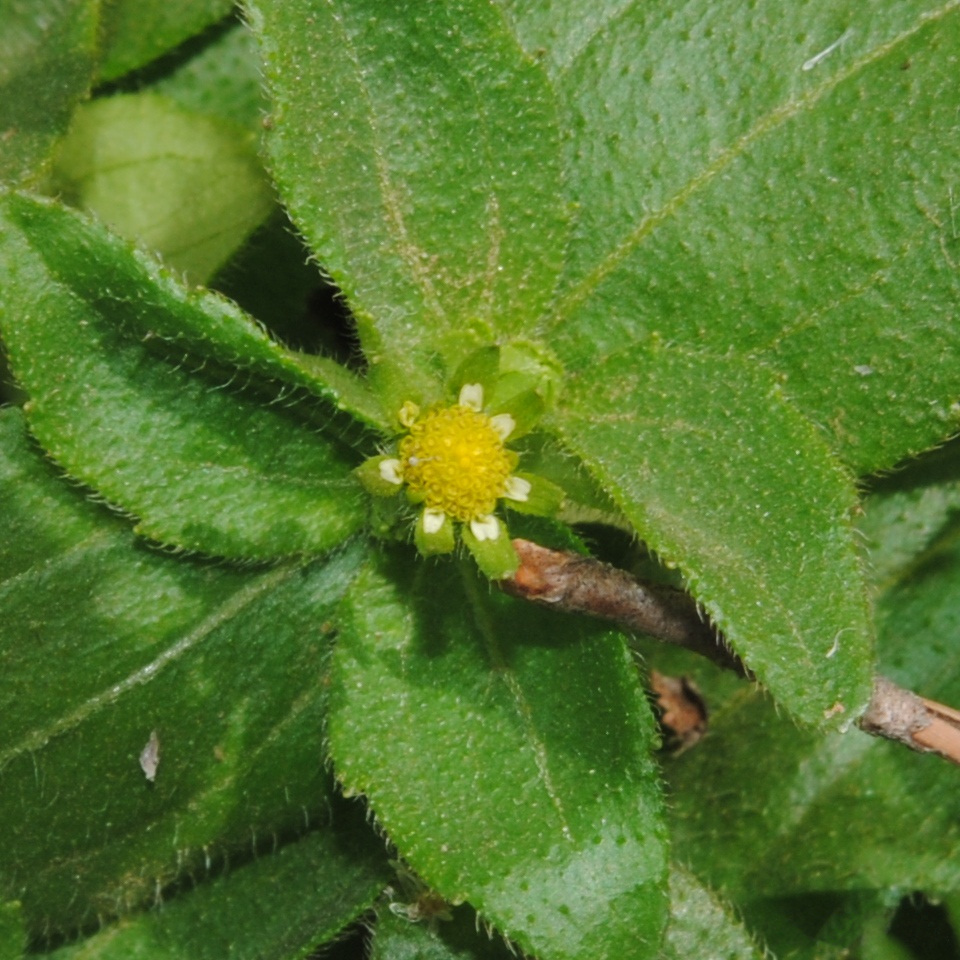
- Jaegeria hirta

Scientific classification
- Kingdom: Plantae
- Clade: Tracheophytes
- Clade: Angiosperms
- Clade: Eudicots
- Clade: Asterids
- Order: Asterales
- Family: Asteraceae
- Subfamily: Asteroideae
- Tribe: Millerieae
- Subtribe: Jaegeriinae; Panero
- Genus: Jaegeria; Kunth

Type species
- Jaegeria mnioides (syn of J. hirta) Kunth

= Jaegeria =

Genus of plants

Jaegeria is a genus of flowering plants in the family Asteraceae found from Mexico to South America. The name commemorates Georg Friedrich von Jaeger.

Species

- Jaegeria axillaris S.F.Blake - Colombia
- Jaegeria bellidiflora (Moc. & Sessé ex DC.) A.M.Torres & Beaman - Mexico (Michoacán, Puebla, México State, D.F., Hidalgo)
- Jaegeria glabra (S.Watson) B.L.Rob. - Mexico (Chihuahua, Durango, Guanajuato, Jalisco, Michoacán, Nayarit, México State, Querétaro)
- Jaegeria gracilis Hook.f. - Ecuador including Galápagos
- Jaegeria hirta (Lag.) Less. - widespread from Mexico (Chihuahua) to Uruguay
- Jaegeria macrocephala Less. - Mexico (Veracruz, México State, Michoacán, Nayarit, Jalisco
- Jaegeria pedunculata Hook. & Arn. - Mexico (Michoacán, Nayarit, Jalisco)
- Jaegeria purpurascens B.L.Rob. - Mexico (Durango)
- Jaegeria standleyi (Steyerm.) B.L.Turner - Mexico (Chiapas), Guatemala
- Jaegeria sterilis McVaugh - Mexico (Jalisco)

Former species

Several species were once considered as belonging to Jaegeria but have now been re-classified into other genera such as Acmella, Galinsoga, Guizotia, or Sphagneticola.
