= Guardiola odontophylla =

Scientific classification
- Kingdom: Plantae
- Clade: Tracheophytes
- Clade: Angiosperms
- Clade: Eudicots
- Clade: Asterids
- Order: Asterales
- Family: Asteraceae
- Genus: Guardiola
- Species: G. odontophylla

Binomial name
- Guardiola odontophylla B.L.Rob.

Species of flowering plant

Guardiola odontophylla is a rare North American species of plants in the family Asteraceae. It is found only in northern Mexico in the state of Durango.

Guardiola odontophylla is a branching perennial with a purple stem, hairless and appearing whitish because of a waxy coating. Flower heads have both ray flowers and disc flowers.
