= Desmanthodium =

Scientific classification
- Kingdom: Plantae
- Clade: Tracheophytes
- Clade: Angiosperms
- Clade: Eudicots
- Clade: Asterids
- Order: Asterales
- Family: Asteraceae
- Subfamily: Asteroideae
- Tribe: Millerieae
- Subtribe: Desmanthodiinae; H.Rob.
- Genus: Desmanthodium; Benth.

Type species
- Desmanthodium perfoliatum Benth.

Genus of flowering plants

Desmanthodium is a genus of flowering plants in the family Asteraceae.

Species

- Desmanthodium blepharopodum S.F.Blake - Venezuela (Trujillo State)
- Desmanthodium fruticosum Greenm. - Jalisco, Nayarit, Guerrero, Colima, Oaxaca, Michoacán, México State
- Desmanthodium guatemalense Hemsl. - Guatemala, Honduras, El Salvador
- Desmanthodium hintoniorum B.L.Turner - Oaxaca
- Desmanthodium lanceolatum Greenm. - Morelos, México State
- Desmanthodium ovatum Benth. - Oaxaca, Morelos, México State
- Desmanthodium perfoliatum Benth. - Oaxaca, Chiapas, México State, Guerrero
- Desmanthodium tomentosum Brandegee - Guatemala, Chiapas
