= Freya alba =

Scientific classification
- Kingdom: Plantae
- Clade: Tracheophytes
- Clade: Angiosperms
- Clade: Eudicots
- Clade: Asterids
- Order: Asterales
- Family: Asteraceae
- Subfamily: Asteroideae
- Tribe: Millerieae
- Subtribe: Galinsoginae
- Genus: Freya; V.M.Badillo
- Species: F. alba

Binomial name
- Freya alba V.M.Badillo

Species of flowering plant

Freya alba is a South American species of flowering plant in the daisy family, Asteraceae, and the only species in the genus Freya.

The genus name of Freya is in reference to Freyja, the Norse goddess associated with love, beauty, fertility, sex, war, gold, and seiðr (magic for seeing and influencing the future).

The genus was circumscribed by Victor Manuel Badillo in Ernstia Vol.33 on page 9 in 1985.
