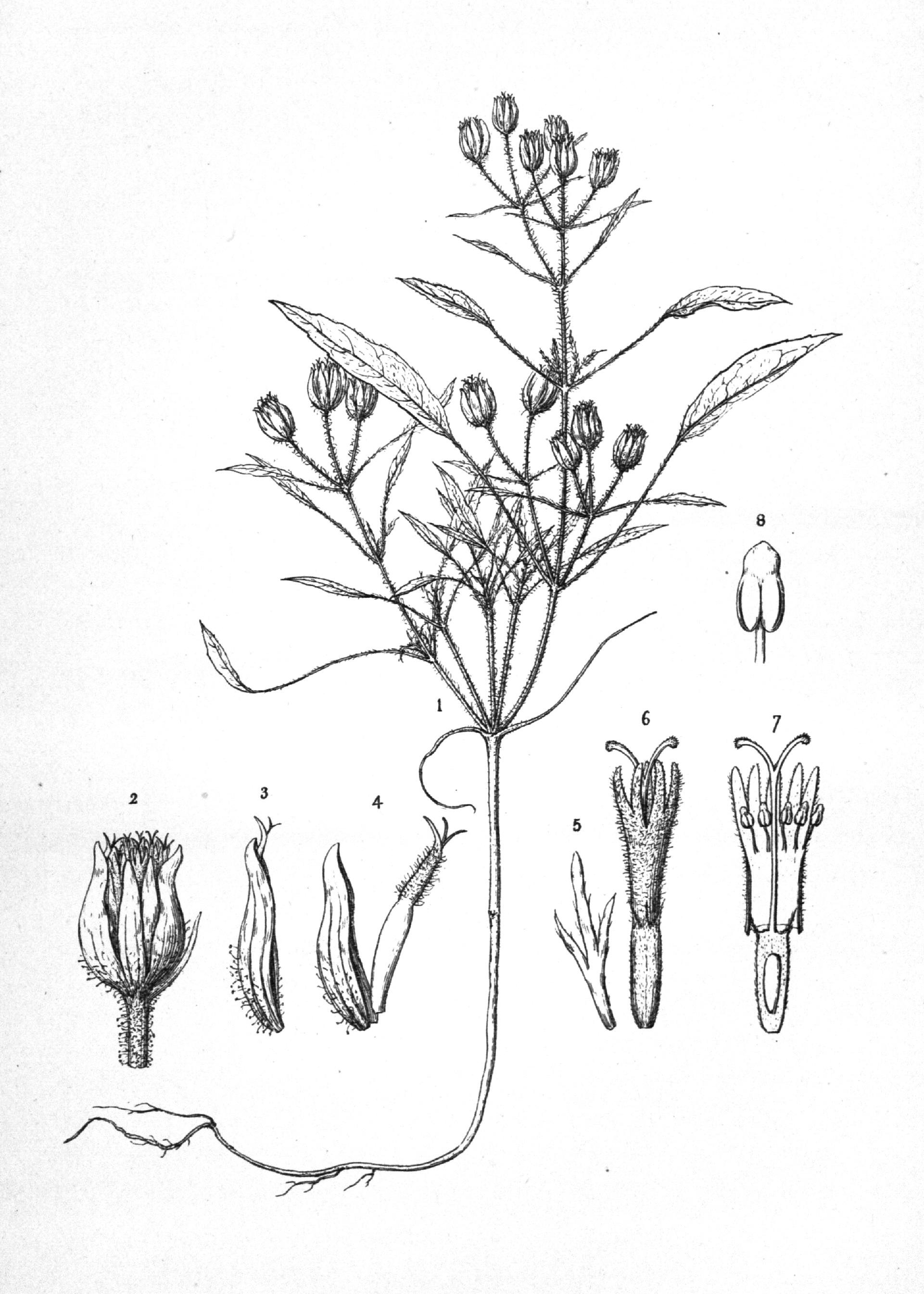
- The illustration of Faxonia pusilla from the type description.

Scientific classification
- Kingdom: Plantae
- Clade: Embryophytes
- Clade: Tracheophytes
- Clade: Angiosperms
- Clade: Eudicots
- Clade: Asterids
- Order: Asterales
- Family: Asteraceae
- Subfamily: Asteroideae
- Tribe: Millerieae
- Subtribe: Galinsoginae
- Genus: Faxonia; Brandegee
- Species: F. pusilla

Binomial name
- Faxonia pusilla Brandegee

= Faxonia =

Genus of flowering plants

Faxonia is a monotypic genus of flowering plants in the family Asteraceae. It contains the single species Faxonia pusilla, endemic to the Mexican State of Baja California Sur. This genus is only known from the singular type specimen collected by Townshend Stith Brandegee in the Sierra de la Laguna in 1893, and is possibly extinct.

The genus is named for botanical illustrator Charles Edward Faxon of Arnold Arboretum.
