= Cymophora =

Scientific classification
- Kingdom: Plantae
- Clade: Tracheophytes
- Clade: Angiosperms
- Clade: Eudicots
- Clade: Asterids
- Order: Asterales
- Family: Asteraceae
- Subfamily: Asteroideae
- Tribe: Millerieae
- Subtribe: Galinsoginae
- Genus: Cymophora; B.L.Rob.

Type species
- Cymophora pringlei B.L.Rob.

Genus of flowering plants

Cymophora is a genus of flowering plants in the family Asteraceae. All known species are native to Mexico.

Some authors have included these plants in the genus Tridax because they are morphologically similar with the same chromosome count. Others find that they have sufficient morphological differences to be kept separate.

Species

- Cymophora accedens - Guerrero, Oaxaca, Michoacán, Jalisco
- Cymophora hintonii - Michoacán, Jalisco, Colima
- Cymophora luckowana - Guerrero
- Cymophora pringlei - Guerrero
