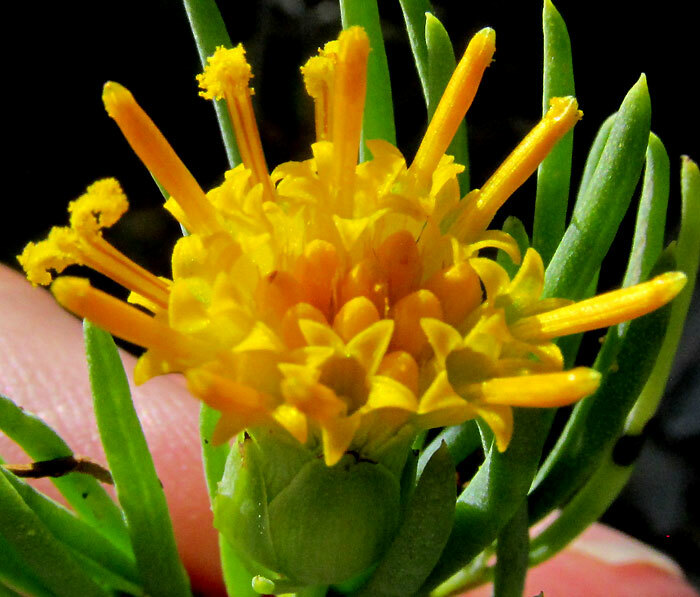
- Dyscritothamnus filifolius, flowering head and leaves

Scientific classification
- Kingdom: Plantae
- Clade: Tracheophytes
- Clade: Angiosperms
- Clade: Eudicots
- Clade: Asterids
- Order: Asterales
- Family: Asteraceae
- Subfamily: Asteroideae
- Tribe: Millerieae
- Subtribe: Dyscritothamninae; Panero
- Genus: Dyscritothamnus; B.L.Rob.

Type species
- Dyscritothamnus filifolius B.L.Rob.

= Dyscritothamnus =

Genus of flowering plants

Dyscritothamnus is a genus of Mexican flowering plants in the daisy family.

== Description ==
The genus Dyscritothamnus, comprising only two species, is distinguished by this combination of features:

- They are woody shrubs with leaves appearing singly at each point along the stems, not opposite one another.
- Flowering heads consist of reduced flowers (florets) with orange corollas
- Two series of bracts of conspicuously different lengths form a cylindrical structure, the involucre, from which the florets arise in two series.
- Atop the one-seeded, cypsela-type fruits the pappuses consist of numerous bristles with tiny projections along their sides, like barbs along a very slender feather's rachis.

== List of species ==
As of 2025, these species are recognized:

- Dyscritothamnus filifolius B.L.Rob. - Guanajuato, Hidalgo
- Dyscritothamnus mirandae Paray - Querétaro
