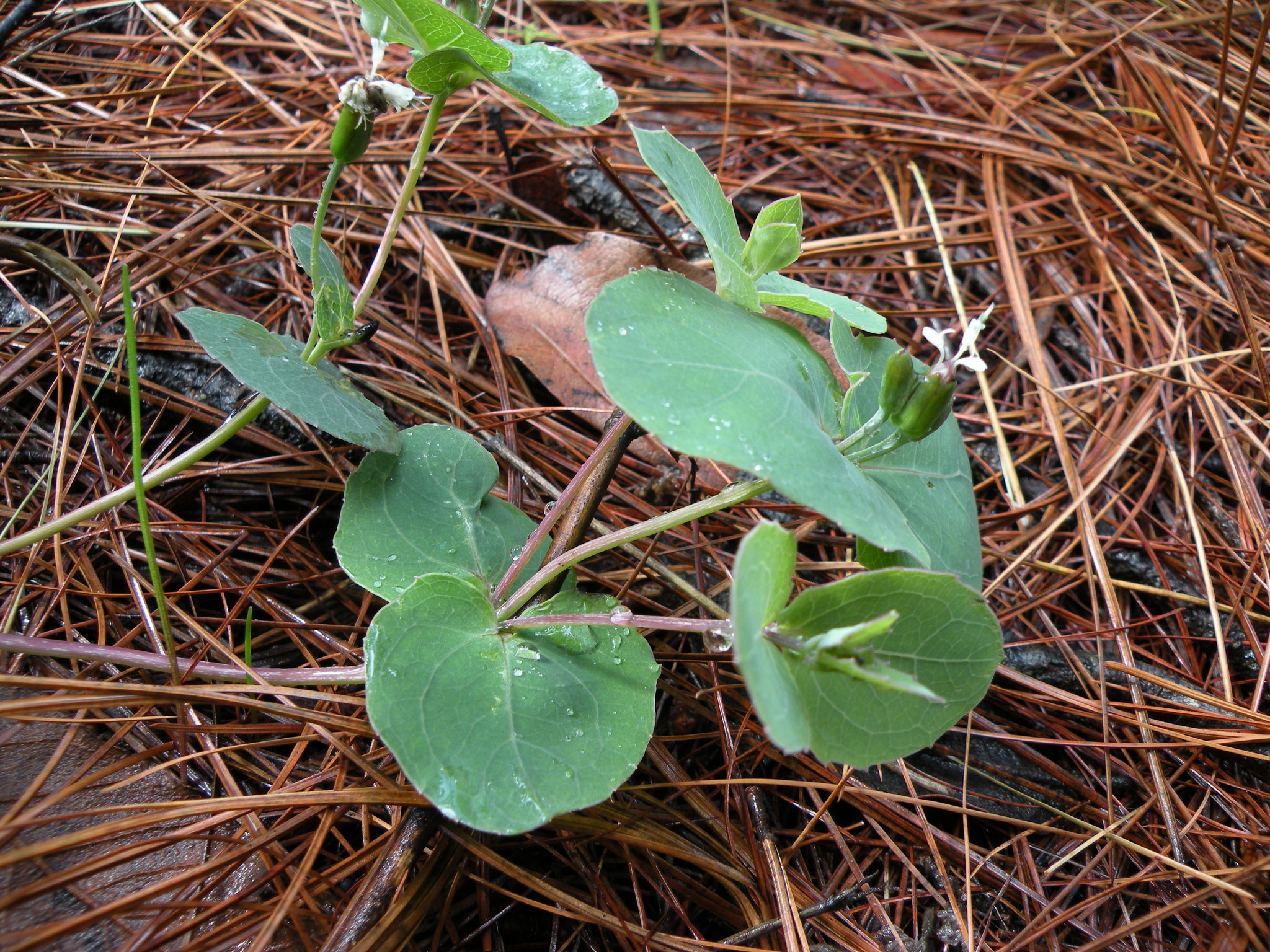

Scientific classification
- Kingdom: Plantae
- Clade: Tracheophytes
- Clade: Angiosperms
- Clade: Eudicots
- Clade: Asterids
- Order: Asterales
- Family: Asteraceae
- Genus: Guardiola
- Species: G. rosei

Binomial name
- Guardiola rosei B.L.Rob.

= Guardiola rosei =

Species of flowering plant

Guardiola rosei is a rare North American species of plants in the family Asteraceae. It is found only in northern Mexico in the states of Chihuahua, Durango, and Nayarit.

Guardiola rosei is a perennial herb up to 40 cm (16 in) tall, hairless and covered with wax so as to appear whitish. flower heads contain both ray flowers and disc flowers.
