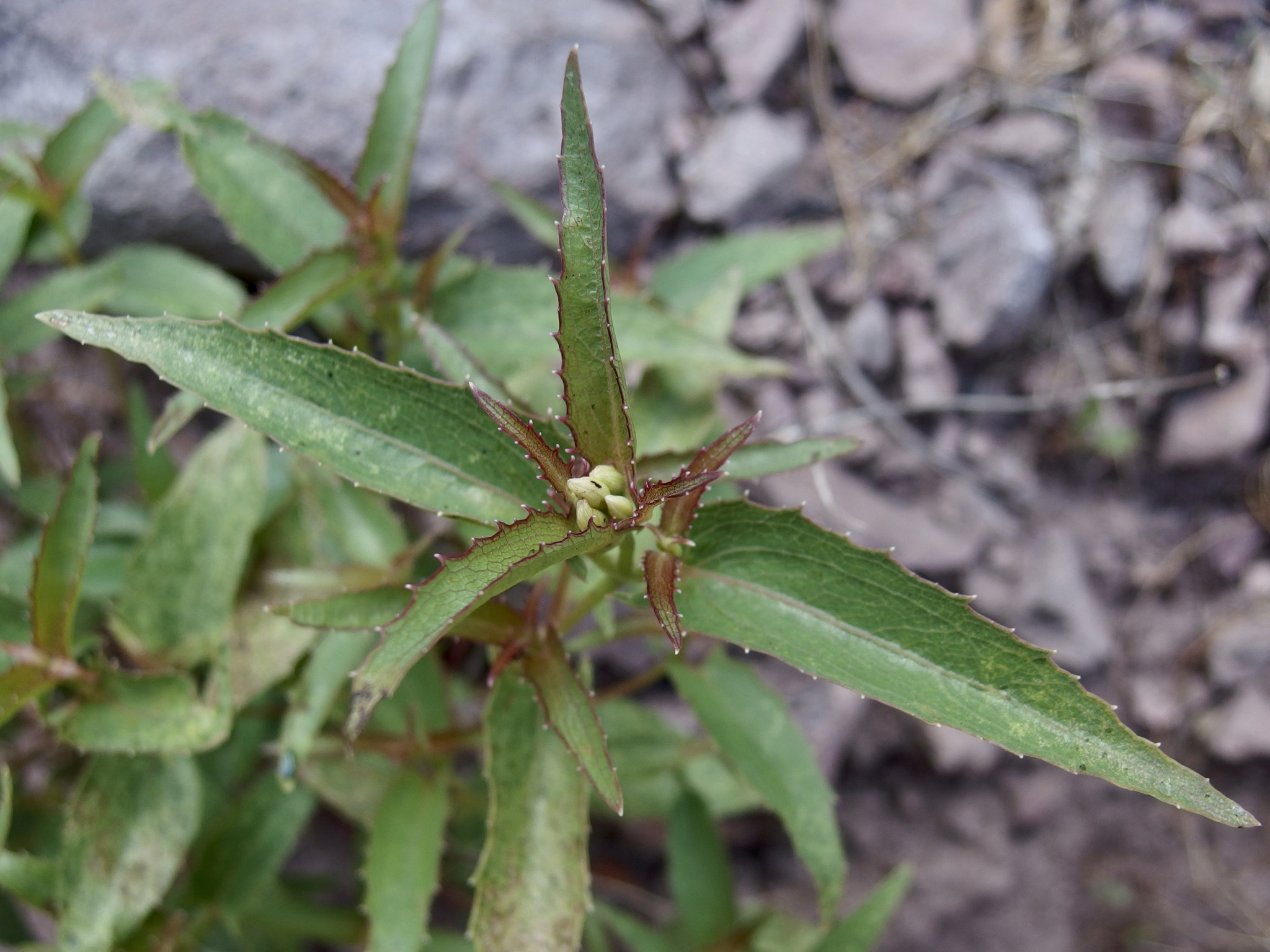

Scientific classification
- Kingdom: Plantae
- Clade: Tracheophytes
- Clade: Angiosperms
- Clade: Eudicots
- Clade: Asterids
- Order: Asterales
- Family: Asteraceae
- Genus: Guardiola
- Species: G. arguta

Binomial name
- Guardiola arguta (A.Gray) B.L.Rob.

Synonyms
- Guardiola tulocarpus var. arguta A.Gray 1886; Guardiola tulocarpus var. arguta A.Gray ex S.Watson

= Guardiola arguta =

Species of flowering plant

Guardiola arguta is a rare North American species of plants in the family Asteraceae. It is found only in northern Mexico in the state of Chihuahua.
