= Aphanactis =

Scientific classification
- Kingdom: Plantae
- Clade: Embryophytes
- Clade: Tracheophytes
- Clade: Spermatophytes
- Clade: Angiosperms
- Clade: Eudicots
- Clade: Asterids
- Order: Asterales
- Family: Asteraceae
- Subfamily: Asteroideae
- Tribe: Millerieae
- Subtribe: Galinsoginae
- Genus: Aphanactis; Wedd.

Genus of flowering plants

Aphanactis is a genus of flowering plants in the family Asteraceae.

The genus is native to the Andes of northwestern South America, except for one species from southern Mexico.

Species

- Aphanactis antisanensis H.Rob. - Ecuador
- Aphanactis barclayae H.Rob. - Ecuador
- Aphanactis boliviana H.Rob. - Bolivia
- Aphanactis cocuyensis Cuatrec. - Colombia
- Aphanactis hutchisonii H.Rob. - Peru
- Aphanactis jamesoniana Wedd. - Ecuador
- Aphanactis ligulata Cuatrec. - Colombia
- Aphanactis macdonaldii B.L.Turner - Oaxaca
- Aphanactis ollgaardii H.Rob. - Ecuador
- Aphanactis piloselloides Cuatrec. - Colombia
- Aphanactis villosa S.F.Blake - Ecuador, Peru
