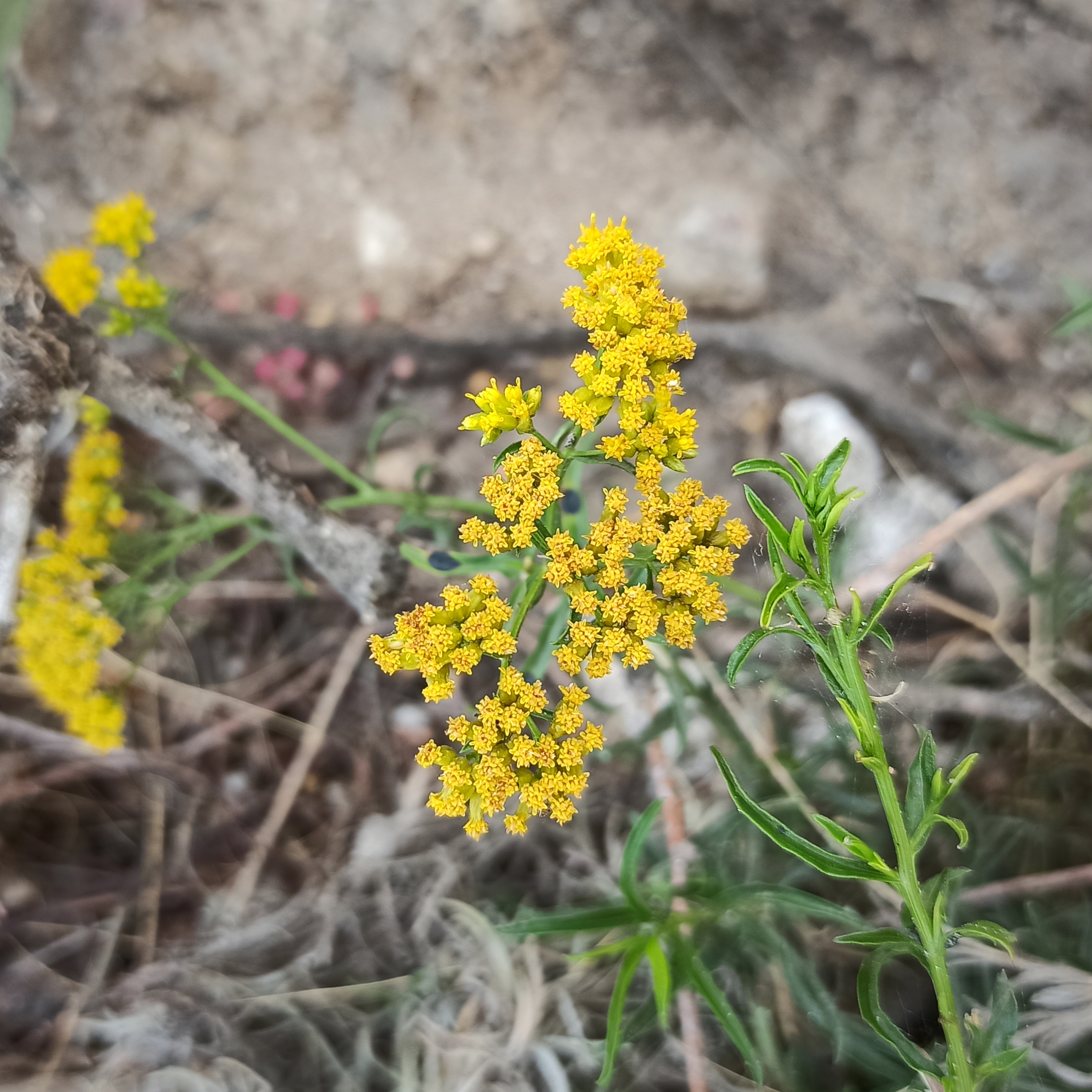
- Gymnosperma glutinosum

Scientific classification
- Kingdom: Plantae
- Clade: Tracheophytes
- Clade: Angiosperms
- Clade: Eudicots
- Clade: Asterids
- Order: Asterales
- Family: Asteraceae
- Subfamily: Asteroideae
- Tribe: Astereae
- Subtribe: Gutiereziinae
- Genus: Gymnosperma; Less.
- Species: G. glutinosum

Binomial name
- Gymnosperma glutinosum (Spreng.) Less. 1832

Synonyms
- Selloa Spreng., Dec 1818, illegitimate homonym not Kunth Oct 1818; Selloa glutinosa Spreng.; Gymnosperma scoparium DC.; Xanthocephalum glutinosum (Spreng.) Shinners; Gymnosperma corymbosum DC.; Gymnosperma multiflorum DC.; Selloa scoparia Kuntze; Baccharis pingraea Nutt.; Selloa multiflora Kuntze; Baccharis fasciculosa Klatt

= Gymnosperma =

Genus of flowering plants

Gymnosperma is a genus of flowering plants in the family Asteraceae. The only known species is Gymnosperma glutinosum, also known as gumhead, which is native to Mexico, Guatemala, and the southwestern United States (Arizona, New Mexico, Texas).
