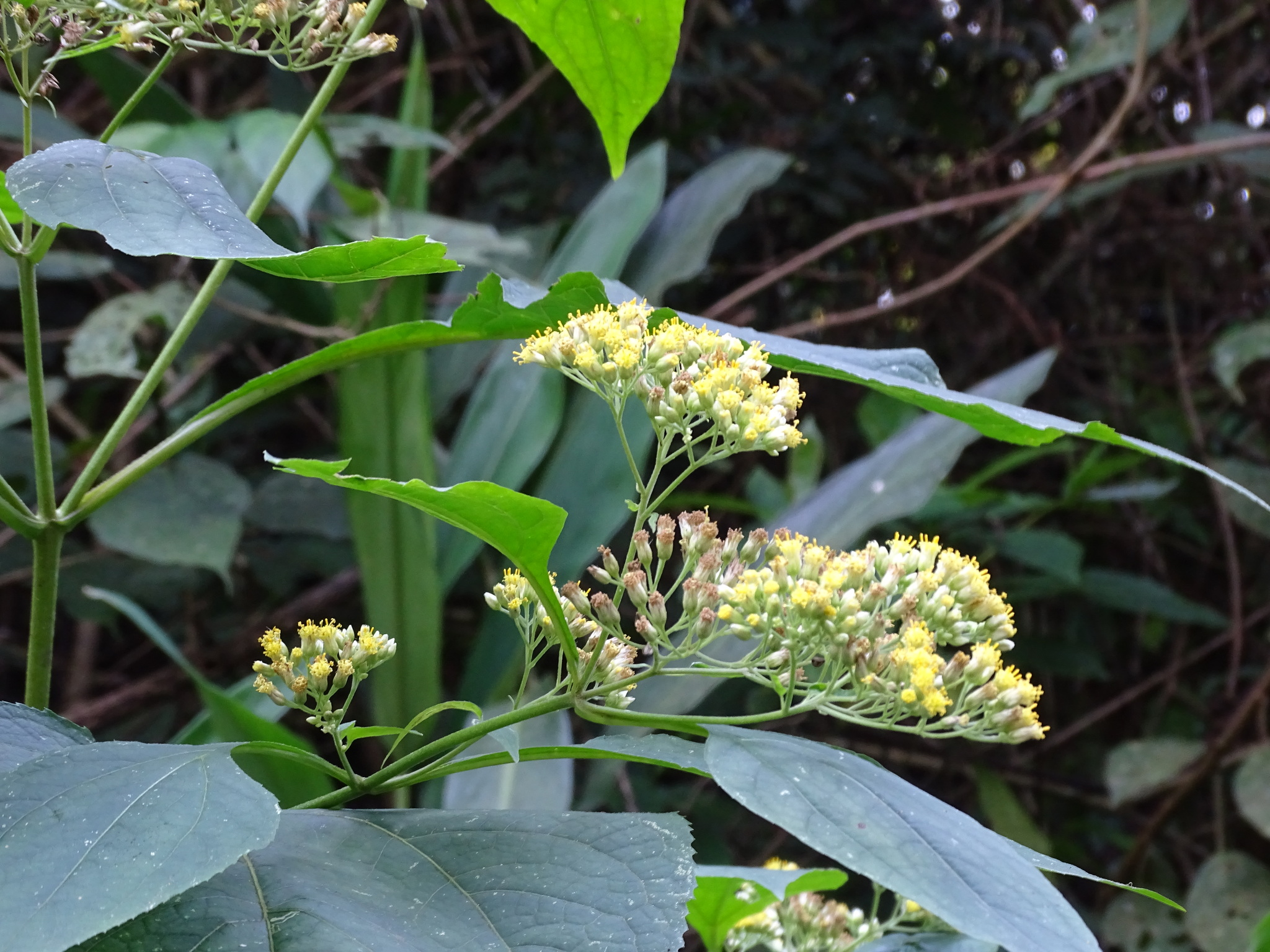
- Schistocarpha eupatorioides in Mexico

Scientific classification
- Kingdom: Plantae
- Clade: Tracheophytes
- Clade: Angiosperms
- Clade: Eudicots
- Clade: Asterids
- Order: Asterales
- Family: Asteraceae
- Subfamily: Asteroideae
- Tribe: Millerieae
- Subtribe: Galinsoginae
- Genus: Schistocarpha; Less.

Type species
- Schistocarpha bicolor Less.

Synonyms
- Neilreichia Fenzl; Zycona Kuntze; Zycoma Kuntze

= Schistocarpha =

Genus of plants

Schistocarpha is a genus of flowering plants in the tribe Millerieae within the family Asteraceae. Species of this genus are native to the Neotropics.

Species

- Schistocarpha bicolor Less. – Central America, southern Mexico
- Schistocarpha croatii H.Rob. – Panama
- Schistocarpha eupatorioides (Fenzl) Kuntze – Central America, southern Mexico, western South America, Hispaniola (Dominican Republic, Haiti)
- Schistocarpha hondurensis Standl. & L.O.Williams – Honduras, El Salvador
- Schistocarpha kellermanii Rydb. – Mexico (Chiapas), Guatemala, Honduras
- Schistocarpha liebmannii Klatt – Mexico (Oaxaca)
- Schistocarpha longiligula Rydb. – Mexico (Chiapas), Guatemala, Nicaragua
- Schistocarpha margaritensis Cuatrec. – Colombia
- Schistocarpha matudae B.L.Rob. – Mexico (Chiapas)
- Schistocarpha pedicellata Klatt – Mexico (Oaxaca)
- Schistocarpha platyphylla Greenm. – Mexico (Chiapas, Oaxaca), Guatemala, El Salvador
- Schistocarpha sinforosi Cuatrec. – Colombia, Ecuador, Peru
- Schistocarpha steyermarkiana H.Rob. – Guatemala
