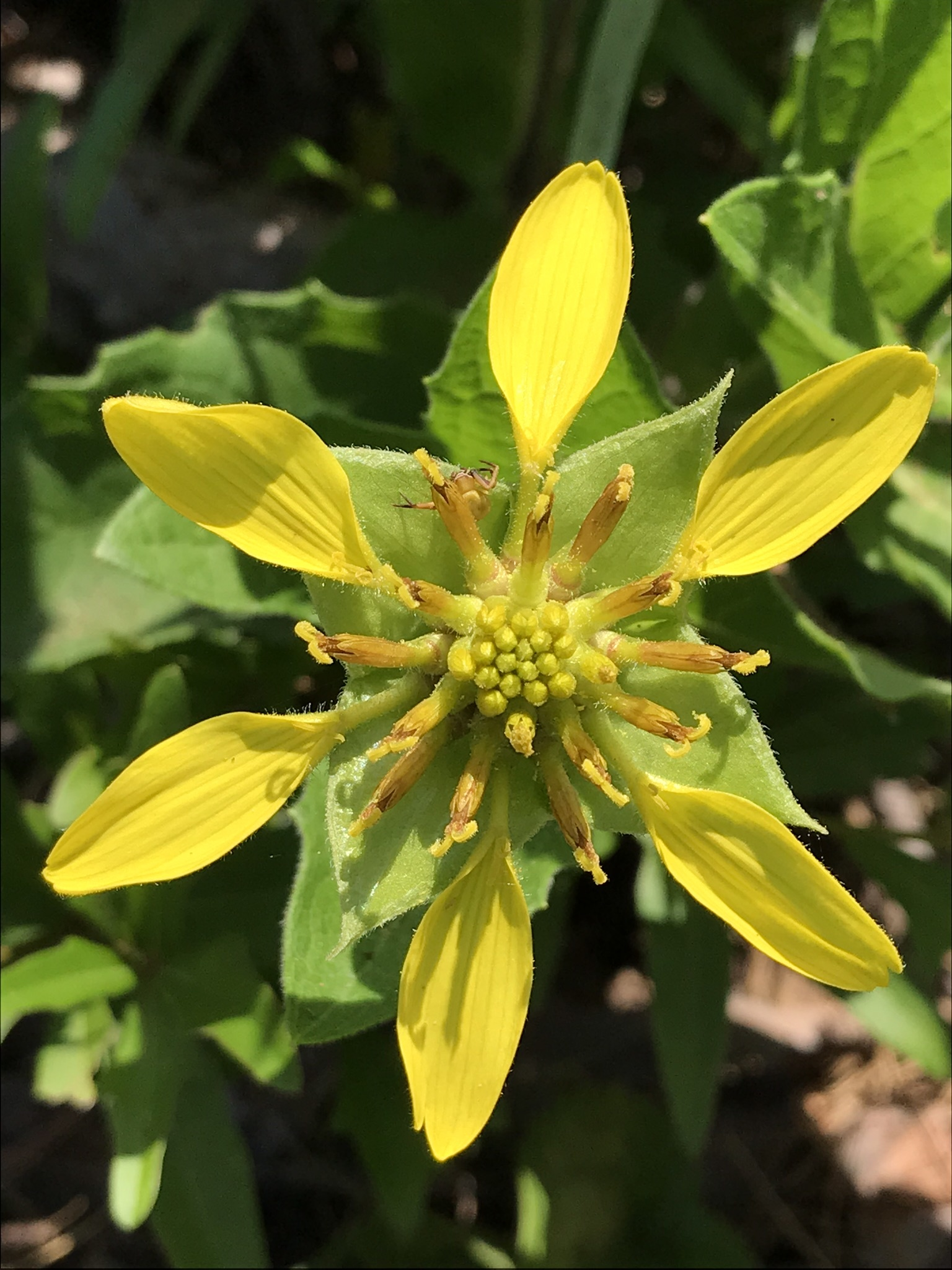

Scientific classification
- Kingdom: Plantae
- Clade: Tracheophytes
- Clade: Angiosperms
- Clade: Eudicots
- Clade: Asterids
- Order: Asterales
- Family: Asteraceae
- Genus: Tetragonotheca
- Species: T. helianthoides

Binomial name
- Tetragonotheca helianthoides L.

= Tetragonotheca helianthoides =

Species of plant

Tetragonotheca helianthoides is a species of flowering plant that grows in the southeastern United States. It is a perennial dicot in the Asteraceae family. Common names for it include pineland nerveray, squarehead, and pineland ginseng. It produces an achene fruit. Several two-foot stems grow from its crown and it has a thick taproot. It has yellow flowers.

It has been observed growing in habitats such as mixed oak woodlands, mixed deciduous flatwoods, and forested uplands.
