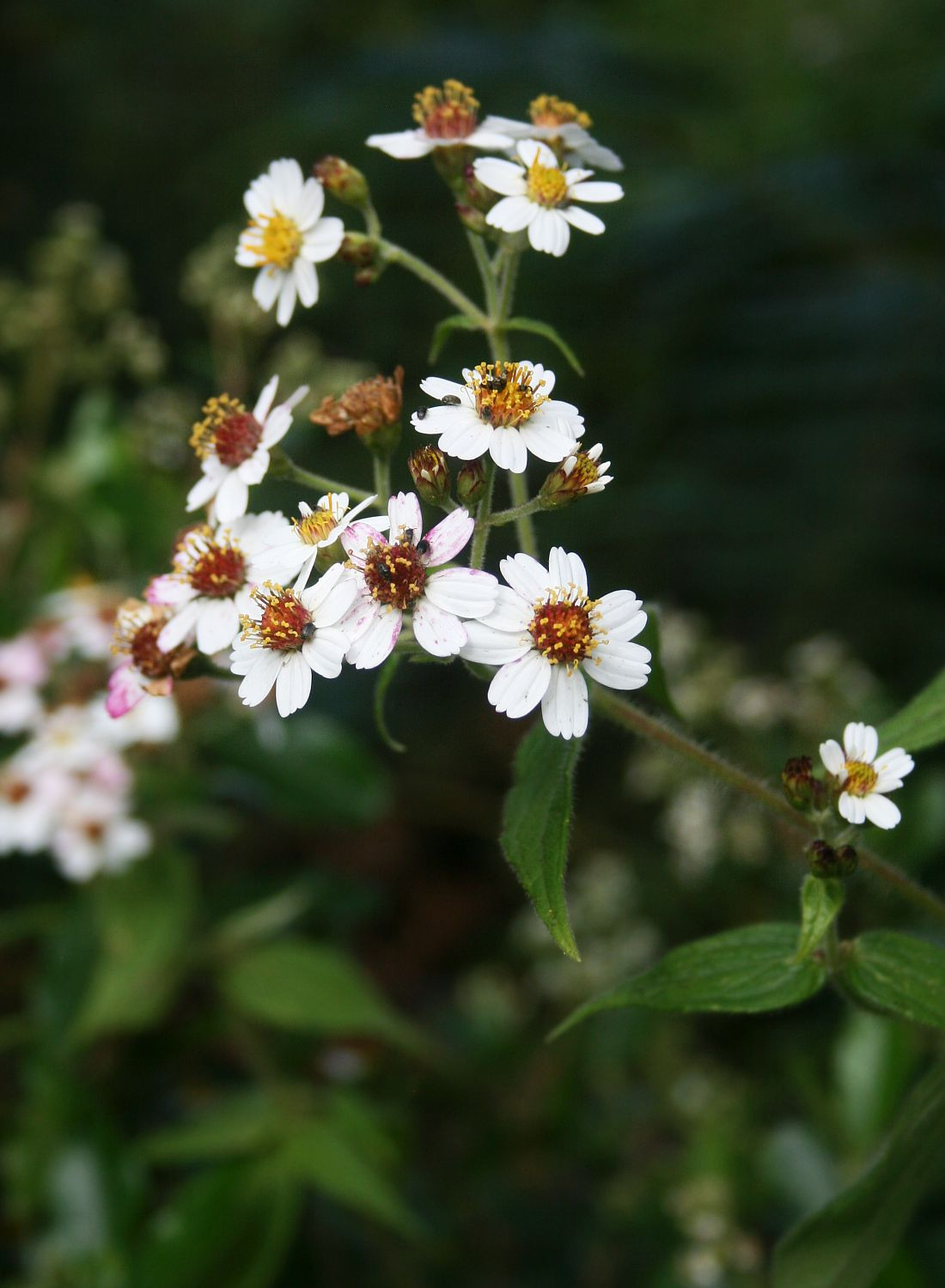
- Alloispermum caracasanum

Scientific classification
- Kingdom: Plantae
- Clade: Tracheophytes
- Clade: Angiosperms
- Clade: Eudicots
- Clade: Asterids
- Order: Asterales
- Family: Asteraceae
- Subtribe: Galinsoginae
- Genus: Alloispermum; Willd. (1807)

Type species
- Alloispermum caracasanum (Kunth) H.Rob.

Species
- 17; see text

Synonyms
- Allocarpus Kunth (1818); Calebrachys Cass. (1828); Calydermos Lag. (1816), nom. illeg.

= Alloispermum =

Genus of flowering plants

Alloispermum is a genus of flowering plants in the family Asteraceae described as a genus in 1807.

Alloispermum is native to Mexico, Central America, and northwestern South America.

== Species ==
17 species are accepted.

- Alloispermum caracasanum (Kunth) H.Rob. - Venezuela, Colombia, Ecuador
- Alloispermum colimense (McVaugh) H.Rob. - Jalisco
- Alloispermum gonzaleziae (B.L.Turner) B.L.Turner - Durango
- Alloispermum guerreroanum B.L.Turner - Guerrero
- Alloispermum insuetum C.F.Fernández, Urbatsch & G.A.Sullivan - Colombia
- Alloispermum integrifolium (DC.) H.Rob. - Central America, C + S Mexico
- Alloispermum lindenii (Wedd.) H.Rob. - W Venezuela
- Alloispermum longiradiatum (Urbatsch & B.L.Turner) B.L.Turner - Guerrero
- Alloispermum michoacanum (B.L.Rob.) B.L.Turner - Michoacán
- Alloispermum pachensis (Hieron.) H.Rob. - Colombia
- Alloispermum palmeri (A.Gray) C.F.Fernández & Urbatsch - Jalisco
- Alloispermum scabrifolium (Hook. & Arn.) H.Rob. - Nayarit
- Alloispermum scabrum (Lag.) H.Rob. - Mexico, Guatemala, Honduras
- Alloispermum sodiroi (Hieron.) H.Rob. - Colombia, Ecuador, Peru
- Alloispermum steyermarkii H.Rob. - Venezuela
- Alloispermum tridacoides (Urbatsch & B.L.Turner) C.F.Fernández & Urbatsch - Sinaloa
- Alloispermum weberbaueri H.Rob. - Peru
