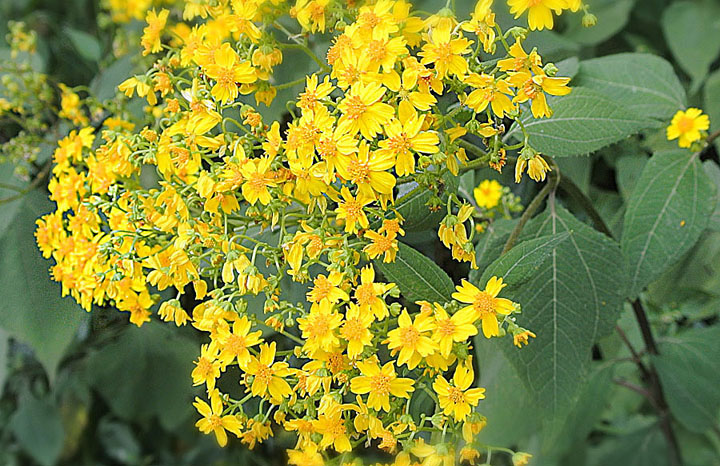
- Rumfordia floribunda

Scientific classification
- Kingdom: Plantae
- Clade: Tracheophytes
- Clade: Angiosperms
- Clade: Eudicots
- Clade: Asterids
- Order: Asterales
- Family: Asteraceae
- Subfamily: Asteroideae
- Tribe: Millerieae
- Subtribe: Milleriinae
- Genus: Rumfordia; DC.

Type species
- Rumfordia floribunda DC.

= Rumfordia =

Genus of plants

Rumfordia is a genus of Mesoamerican plants in the tribe Millerieae within the family Asteraceae.

Species

- Rumfordia alcortae Rzed. - San Luis Potosí, Nuevo León
- Rumfordia connata Brandegee - Baja California Sur
- Rumfordia exauriculata B.L.Turner - Nuevo León
- Rumfordia floribunda DC. - from Sinaloa to Oaxaca
- Rumfordia guatemalensis (J.M.Coult.) S.F.Blake - from Hidalgo to Panama
- Rumfordia penninervis S.F.Blake - Guatemala, Chiapas, Oaxaca
- Rumfordia revealii H.Rob. - Guerrero

formerly included

see Axiniphyllum

- Rumfordia pinnatisecta Paul G.Wilson - Axiniphyllum pinnatisectum (Paul G.Wilson) B.L.Turner
