= Micractis (plant) =

Scientific classification
- Kingdom: Plantae
- Clade: Tracheophytes
- Clade: Angiosperms
- Clade: Eudicots
- Clade: Asterids
- Order: Asterales
- Family: Asteraceae
- Subfamily: Asteroideae
- Tribe: Millerieae
- Subtribe: Milleriinae
- Genus: Micractis; DC.

Type species
- Micractis bojeri DC.

Synonyms
- Limnogenneton Sch.Bip. ex Walp.

Genus of flowering plants

Micractis is a genus of African flowering plants in the family Asteraceae.

Species

- Micractis bojeri DC.
- Micractis discoidea (Vatke) D.L.Schulz
- Micractis drosocephala Chiov.
