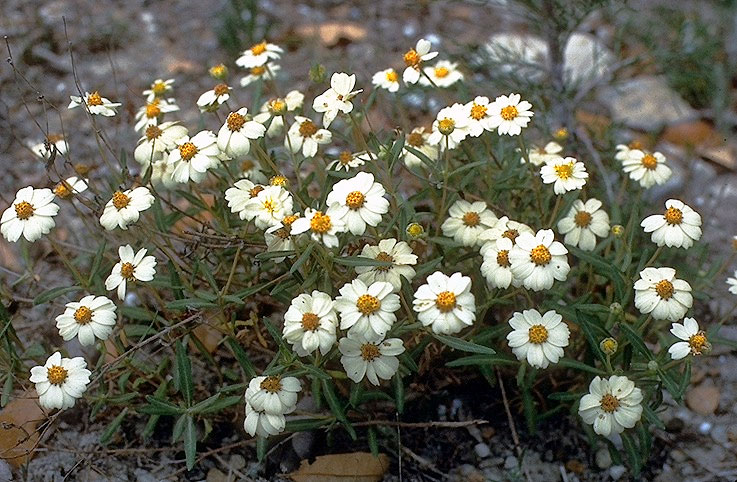
- Melampodium cinereum

Scientific classification
- Kingdom: Plantae
- Clade: Tracheophytes
- Clade: Angiosperms
- Clade: Eudicots
- Clade: Asterids
- Order: Asterales
- Family: Asteraceae
- Subfamily: Asteroideae
- Tribe: Millerieae; Lindl.

Genera
- See text

= Millerieae =

Tribe of flowering plants

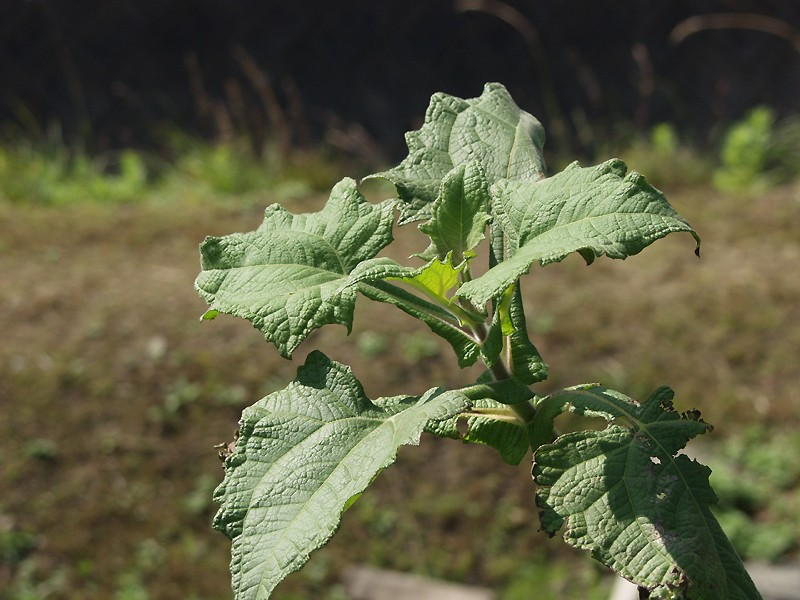
Yacón (Smallanthus sonchifolius)

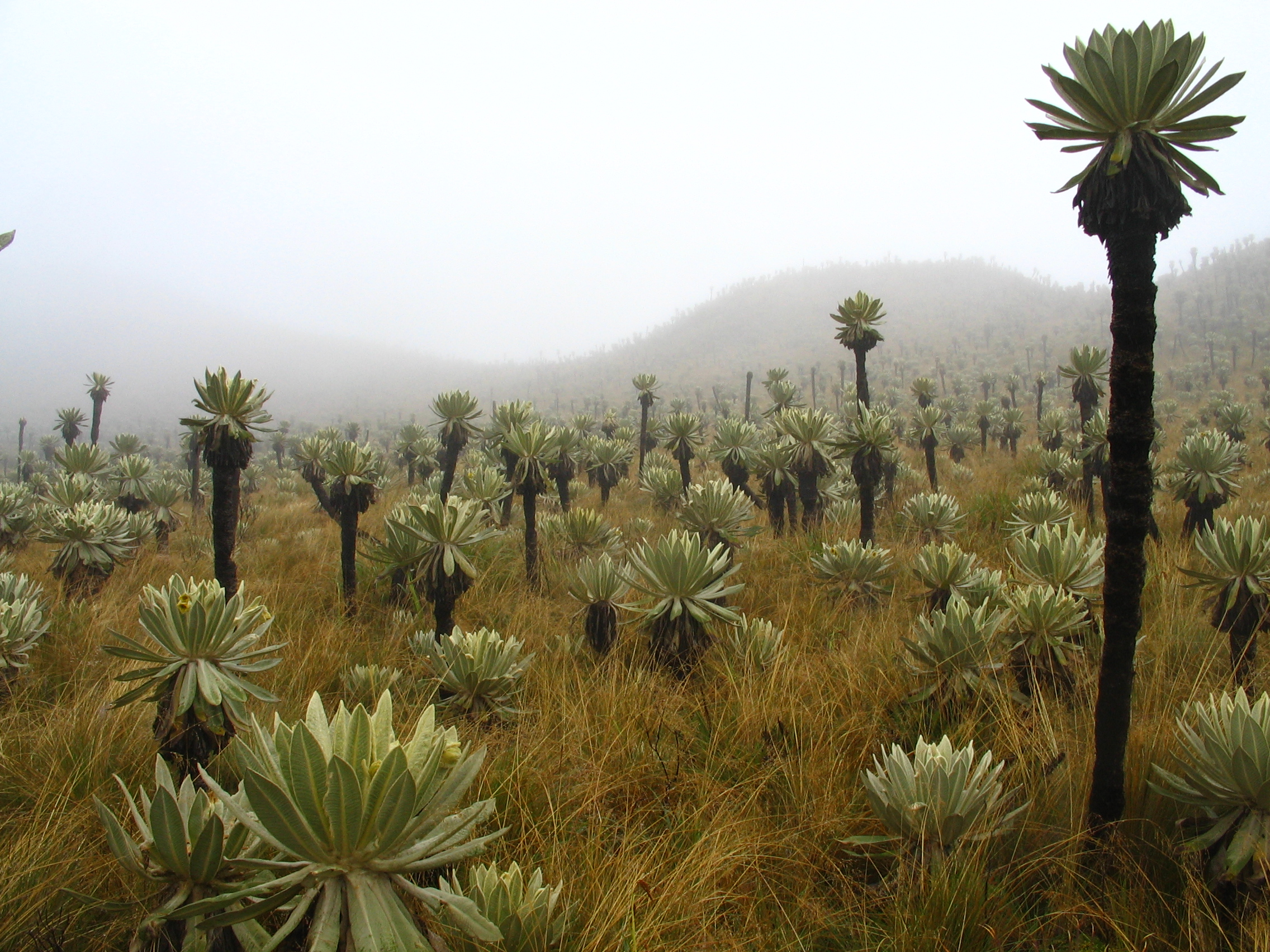
Espeletia pycnophylla in Ecuador.

Millerieae is a tribe of flowering plants belonging to the Asteroideae subfamily. Of all the genera, only Galinsoga, Guizotia, and Sigesbeckia have species native to the Old World.

== Subtribes and genera ==
Millerieae subtribes and genera recognized by the Global Compositae Database as of April 2022:

- Subtribe Desmanthodiinae H.Rob.
  - Desmanthodium Benth.
- Subtribe Dyscritothamninae Panero
  - Dyscritothamnus B.L.Rob.
- Subtribe Espeletiinae Cuatrec.
  - Espeletia Mutis ex Humb. & Bonpl.
  - Ichthyothere Mart.
  - Smallanthus Mack.
  - Tamananthus V.M.Badillo
- Subtribe Galinsoginae Benth. & Hook.f.
  - Alepidocline S.F.Blake
  - Alloispermum Willd.
  - Aphanactis Wedd.
  - Bebbia (Benth.) Greene
  - Cymophora B.L.Rob.
  - Faxonia Brandegee
  - Freya V.M.Badillo
  - Galinsoga Ruiz & Pav.
  - Oteiza La Llave
  - Sabazia Cass.
  - Schistocarpha Less.
  - Selloa Kunth
  - Tridax L.
- Subtribe Guardiolinae H.Rob.
  - Guardiola Cerv. ex Humb. & Bonpl.
- Subtribe Jaegeriinae Panero
  - Jaegeria Kunth
- Subtribe Melampodiinae Less.
  - Acanthospermum Schrank
  - Lecocarpus Decne.
  - Melampodium L.
- Subtribe Milleriinae Benth. & Hook.f.
  - Axiniphyllum Benth.
  - Guizotia Cass.
  - Micractis DC.
  - Milleria Houst. ex L.
  - Rumfordia DC.
  - Sigesbeckia L.
  - Stachycephalum Sch.Bip. ex Benth.
  - Trigonospermum Less.
  - Zandera D.L.Schulz
- Subtribe incertae sedis
  - Tetragonotheca Dill. ex L.
