= Axiniphyllum =

Scientific classification
- Kingdom: Plantae
- Clade: Embryophytes
- Clade: Tracheophytes
- Clade: Angiosperms
- Clade: Eudicots
- Clade: Asterids
- Order: Asterales
- Family: Asteraceae
- Subfamily: Asteroideae
- Tribe: Millerieae
- Subtribe: Milleriinae
- Genus: Axiniphyllum; Benth.

Type species
- Axiniphyllum corymbosum Benth.

Genus of plants

Axiniphyllum is a genus of flowering plants in the family Asteraceae.

Species

All the species are endemic to Mexico.

- Axiniphyllum corymbosum Benth. – Oaxaca
- Axiniphyllum durangense B.L.Turner – Durango
- Axiniphyllum pinnatisectum (Paul G.Wilson) B.L.Turner – Guerrero
- Axiniphyllum sagittalobum B.L.Turner – Guerrero
- Axiniphyllum scabrum (Zucc.) S.F.Blake – Oaxaca
- Axiniphyllum tomentosum Benth. (unplaced)
