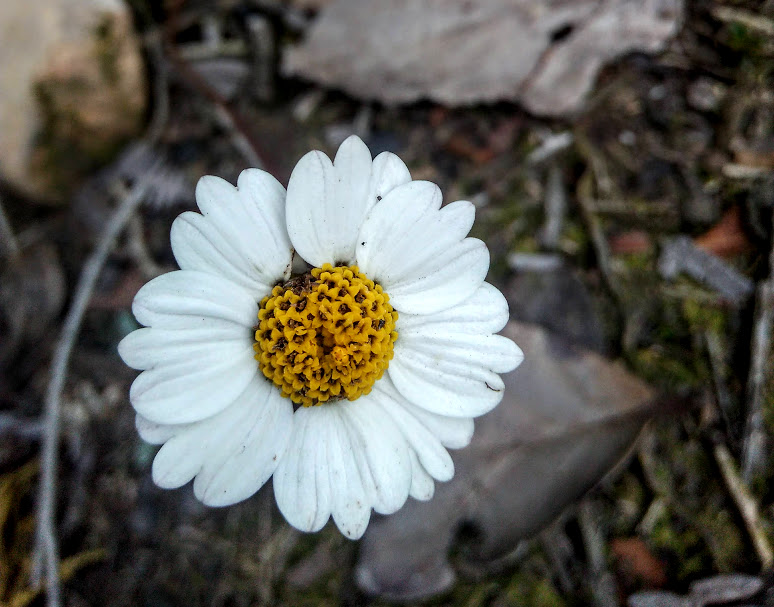

Scientific classification
- Kingdom: Plantae
- Clade: Tracheophytes
- Clade: Angiosperms
- Clade: Eudicots
- Clade: Asterids
- Order: Asterales
- Family: Asteraceae
- Subfamily: Asteroideae
- Tribe: Millerieae
- Subtribe: Galinsoginae
- Genus: Sabazia; Cass.

Type species
- Sabazia humilis (Kunth) Cass.

Synonyms
- Baziasa Steud.; Freya V.M.Badillo; Tricarpha Longpre

= Sabazia =

Genus of plants

Sabazia is a genus of Colombian and Mesoamerican plants in the tribe Millerieae within the family Asteraceae.

Species

- Sabazia acoma (S.F.Blake) Longpre - Colombia
- Sabazia densa Longpre - Costa Rica
- Sabazia durangensis (Longpre) Urbatsch & B.L.Turner - Durango, Sinaloa
- Sabazia elata (Canne) B.L.Turner - Querétaro
- Sabazia glandulosa (Canne) B.L.Turner - Querétaro
- Sabazia humilis (Kunth) Cass. - Michoacán, Oaxaca, Morelos, Mexico City, Chiapas, Hidalgo, Puebla
- Sabazia leavenworthii Longpre - Michoacán
- Sabazia macdonaldii B.L.Turner - Oaxaca
- Sabazia microspermoides Longpre - Guerrero
- Sabazia mullerae S.F.Blake - Nuevo León
- Sabazia multiradiata (Seaton) Longpre - Oaxaca, Puebla, State of Mexico
- Sabazia palmeri (S.Watson ex A.Gray) Urbatsch & B.L.Turner - Michoacán, Jalisco
- Sabazia pinetorum S.F.Blake - Guatemala
- Sabazia purpusii Brandegee - Baja California Sur
- Sabazia sarmentosa Less. - from Veracruz to Panama
- Sabazia trianae (Hieron.) Longpre - Colombia

formerly included

numerous species formerly considered as part of Sabazia but now regarded as more suited to other genera: Alepidocline Alloispermum Galinsoga Jaegeria Selloa
