= Guasca =

- Municipality and town
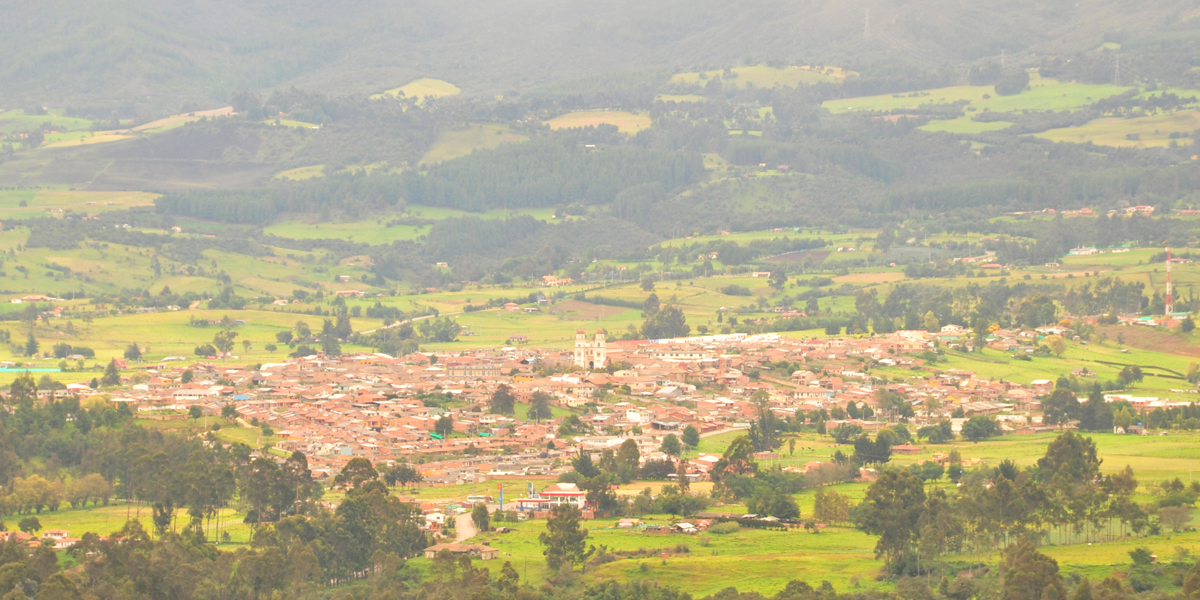
- View of Guasca from the west

- Flag Coat of arms

- Location of the municipality and town of Guasca in the Cundinamarca Department of Colombia

- Location in Colombia
- Coordinates: 4°51′57″N 73°52′38″W
- Country: Colombia
- Department: Cundinamarca
- Province: Guavio Province
- Founded: 21 June 1600
- Founder: Luis Enríquez

Government
  - Mayor: Miguel Arturo Garavito Diaz (2016-2019)

Area
  - Municipality and town: 346 km^{2} (134 sq mi)
  - Urban: 8.8 km^{2} (3.4 sq mi)
- Elevation: 2,710 m (8,890 ft)

Population (2015)
  - Municipality and town: 14,759
  - Density: 42.7/km^{2} (110/sq mi)
  - Urban: 5,203
- Time zone: UTC-5 (Colombia Standard Time)
- Website: Official website

Guasca is a Colombian town and municipality in the Guavio Province, part of the Cundinamarca Department located approximately 55 km from Bogotá passing through the town of La Calera, Cundinamarca or 65 km passing through Sopó. Guasca borders the municipalities Tocancipá and Guatavita in the north, Junín in the east, in the south La Calera and in the west Sopó.

== History ==
Before the Spanish conquest of the Muisca of the central highlands of the Colombian Andes, the Altiplano Cundiboyacense, the area was inhabited by the Muisca who spoke Chibcha. Guasca was ruled by a cacique who was loyal to the cacique of Guatavita. In the religion of the Muisca, the Siecha Lakes were considered sacred.

== Etymology ==
According to friar and Muisca scholar Bernardo de Lugo the name Guasca is derived from guâ, "mountain range" and shucâ; "skirt". The name thus means "skirt of the mountain range", indicating the position of the village with respect to the Eastern Ranges of the Colombian Andes.

== Economy ==
Main economical activities of Guasca are agriculture; potatoes, carrots, flowers and strawberries and dairy farming.

== Tourism ==
Guasca is known for ecotourism and has access to Chingaza Natural National Park. Other natural areas are Los Encenillos and the Siecha Lakes.

== Born in Guasca ==
- Mariano Ospina Rodríguez - president of the Granadine Confederation

== Trivia ==
- The plant Galinsoga parviflora is called "Guasca(s)" in Colombia and an essential ingredient of the soup ajiaco
- The spiders Anapis guasca, Deinopis guasca, and moth Dognina guasca are found in and named after Guasca

== Climate ==
Climate data for Guasca, elevation 2,750 m (9,020 ft), (1981–2010)
| Month | Jan | Feb | Mar | Apr | May | Jun | Jul | Aug | Sep | Oct | Nov | Dec | Year |
|---|---|---|---|---|---|---|---|---|---|---|---|---|---|
| Mean daily maximum °C (°F) | 19.2 (66.6) | 19.4 (66.9) | 19.5 (67.1) | 18.9 (66.0) | 18.4 (65.1) | 17.4 (63.3) | 17.0 (62.6) | 17.2 (63.0) | 17.8 (64.0) | 18.5 (65.3) | 18.8 (65.8) | 18.9 (66.0) | 18.4 (65.1) |
| Daily mean °C (°F) | 13.2 (55.8) | 13.5 (56.3) | 13.6 (56.5) | 13.6 (56.5) | 13.5 (56.3) | 13.0 (55.4) | 12.6 (54.7) | 12.8 (55.0) | 13.0 (55.4) | 13.2 (55.8) | 13.5 (56.3) | 13.4 (56.1) | 13.2 (55.8) |
| Mean daily minimum °C (°F) | 5.9 (42.6) | 6.6 (43.9) | 7.3 (45.1) | 8.3 (46.9) | 8.5 (47.3) | 8.4 (47.1) | 8.2 (46.8) | 8.1 (46.6) | 7.5 (45.5) | 7.6 (45.7) | 7.8 (46.0) | 6.6 (43.9) | 7.6 (45.7) |
| Average precipitation mm (inches) | 37.2 (1.46) | 46.8 (1.84) | 68.2 (2.69) | 83.4 (3.28) | 94.3 (3.71) | 71.1 (2.80) | 72.7 (2.86) | 59.1 (2.33) | 52.6 (2.07) | 85.0 (3.35) | 80.8 (3.18) | 43.7 (1.72) | 794.9 (31.30) |
| Average precipitation days | 7 | 9 | 12 | 16 | 20 | 21 | 22 | 20 | 16 | 15 | 14 | 10 | 177 |
| Average relative humidity (%) | 83 | 82 | 82 | 84 | 85 | 84 | 85 | 85 | 84 | 83 | 84 | 83 | 84 |
Source: Instituto de Hidrologia Meteorologia y Estudios Ambientales

== Gallery ==
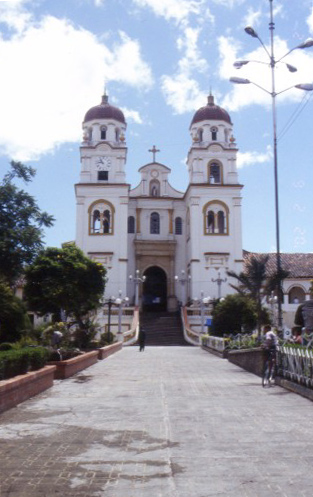
Basilica of Saint Hyacinth

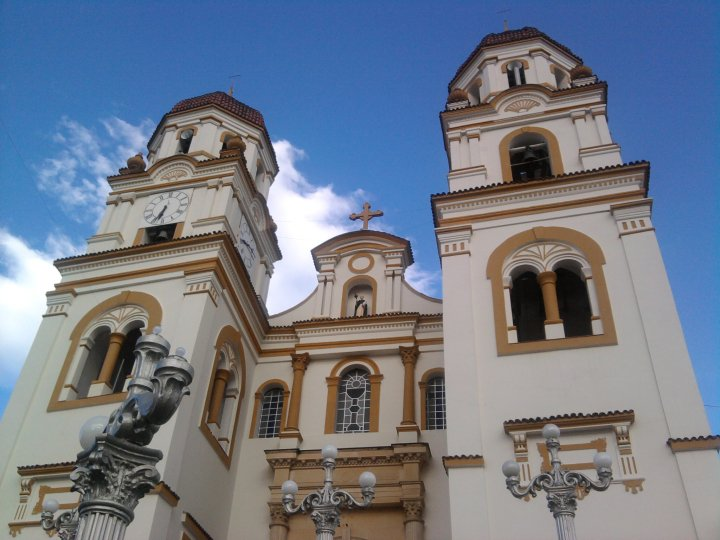
Basilica of Saint Hyacinth

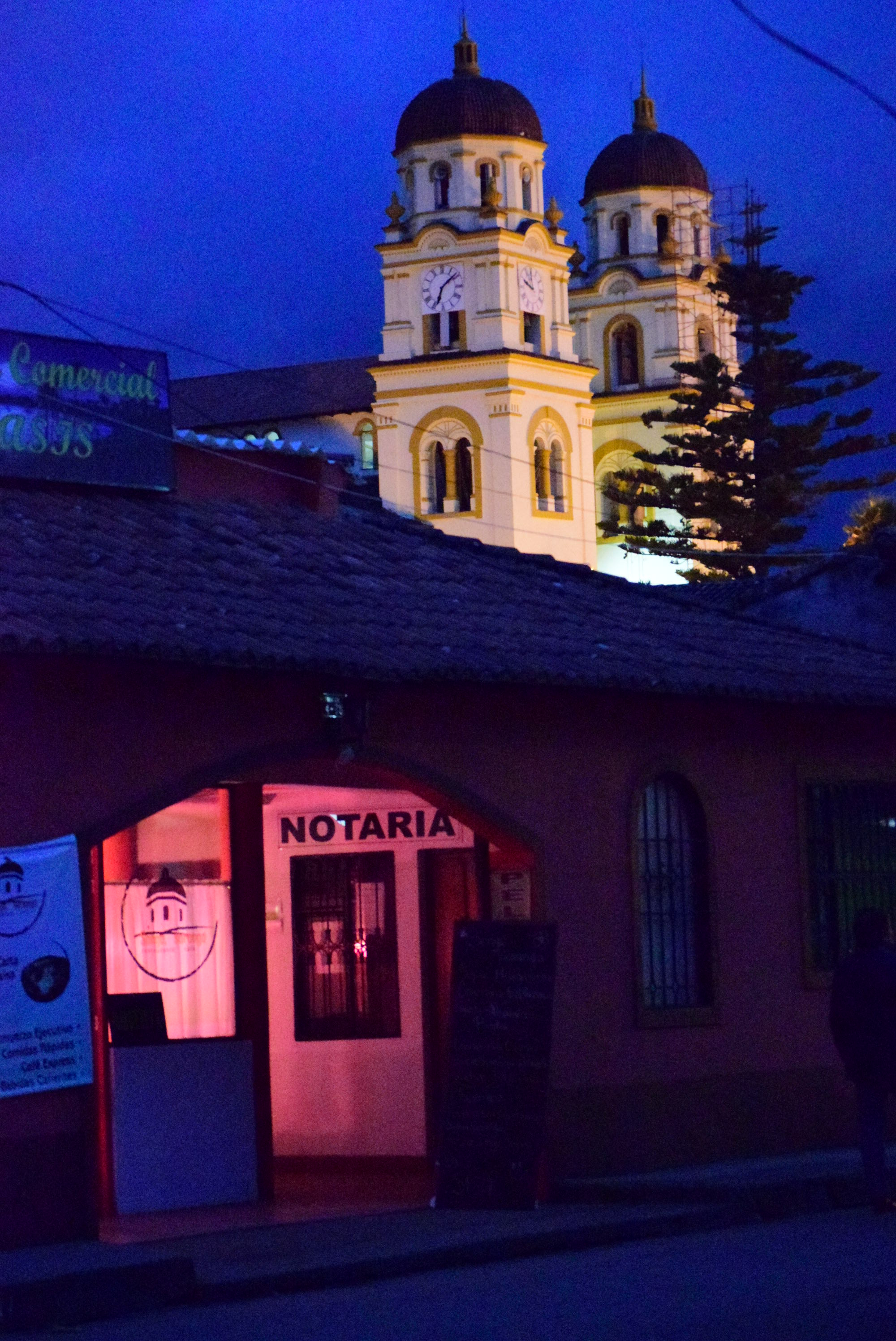
Basilica of Saint Hyacinth by night
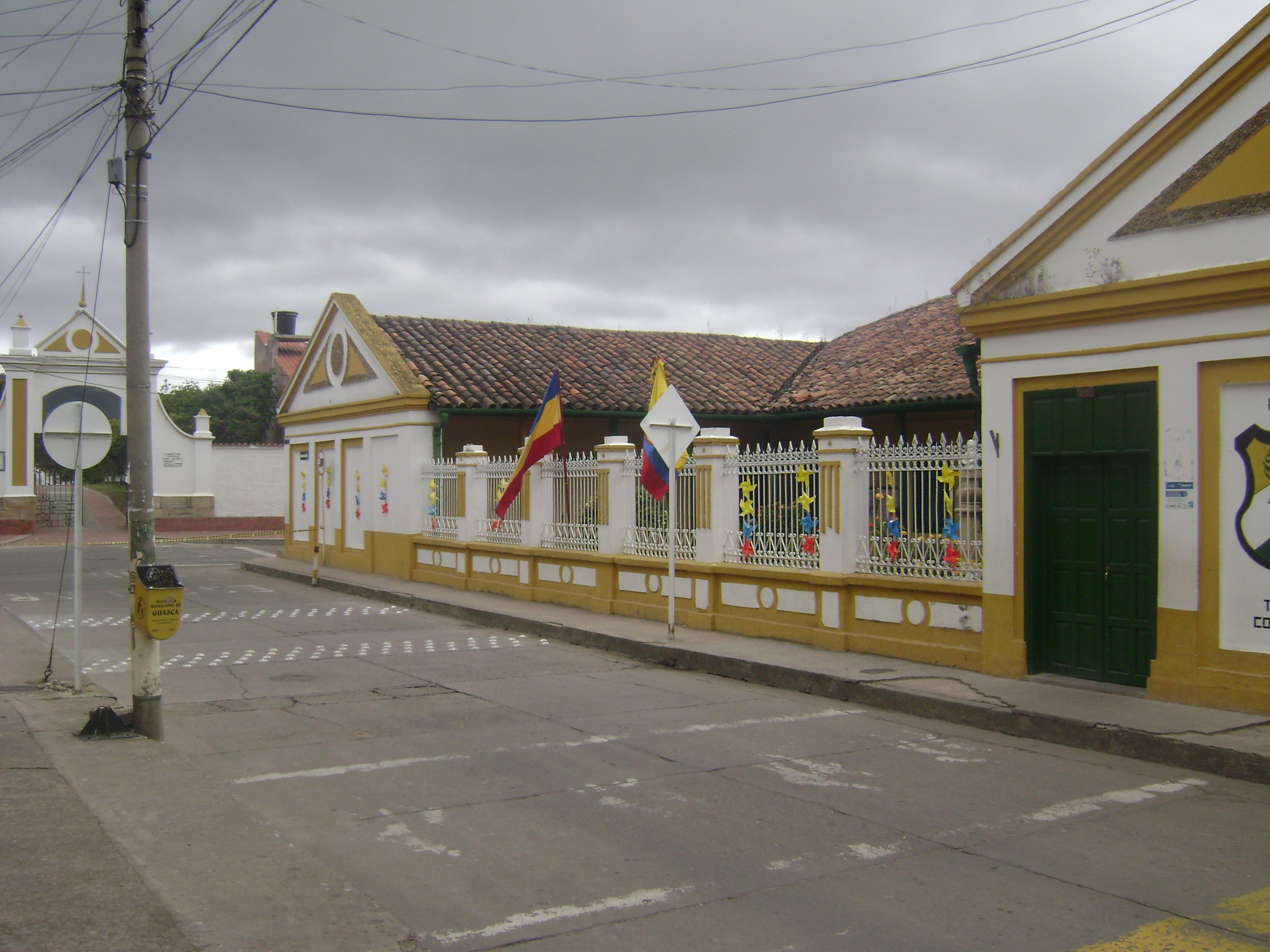
Street view

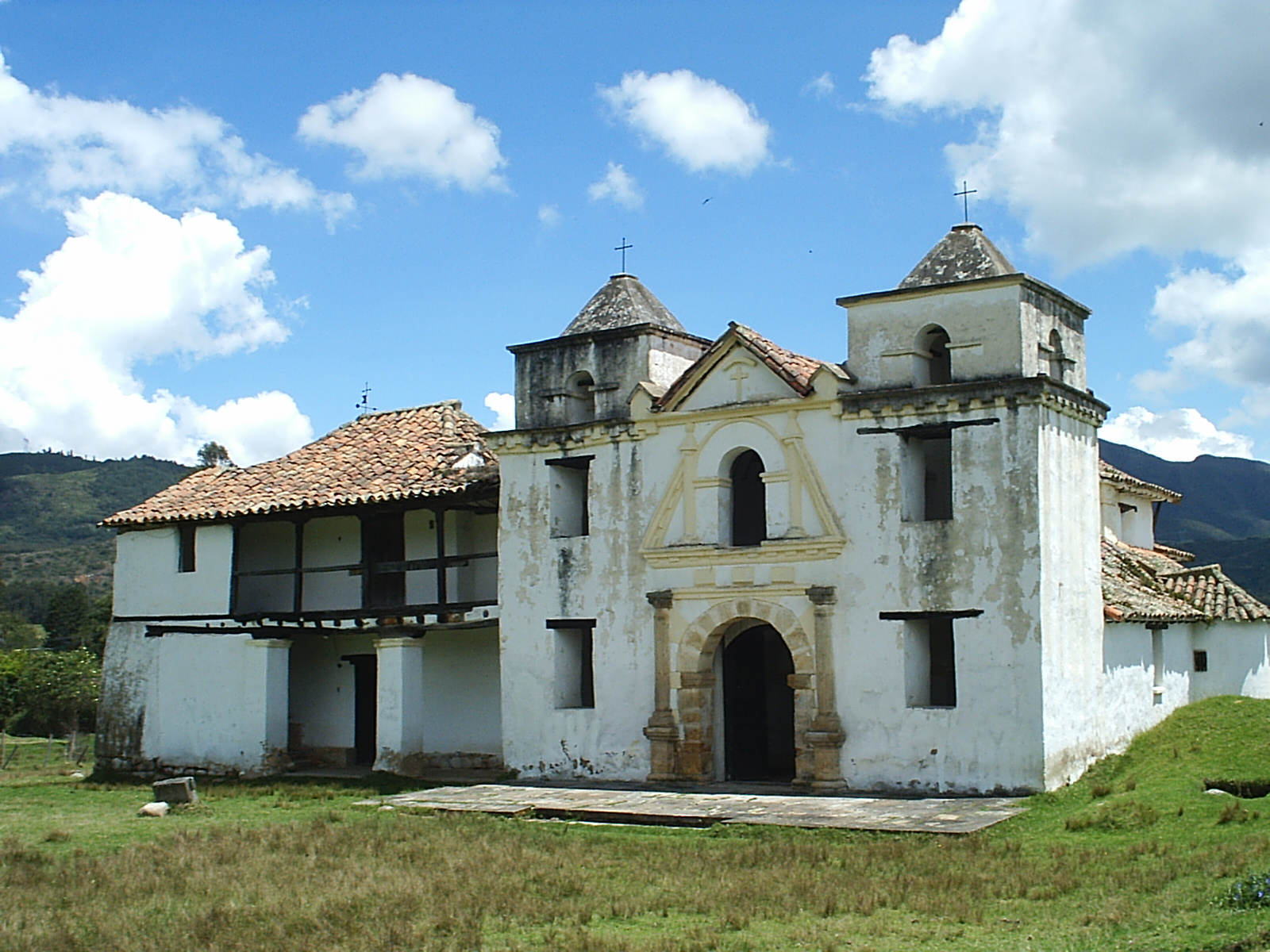
Siecha chapel

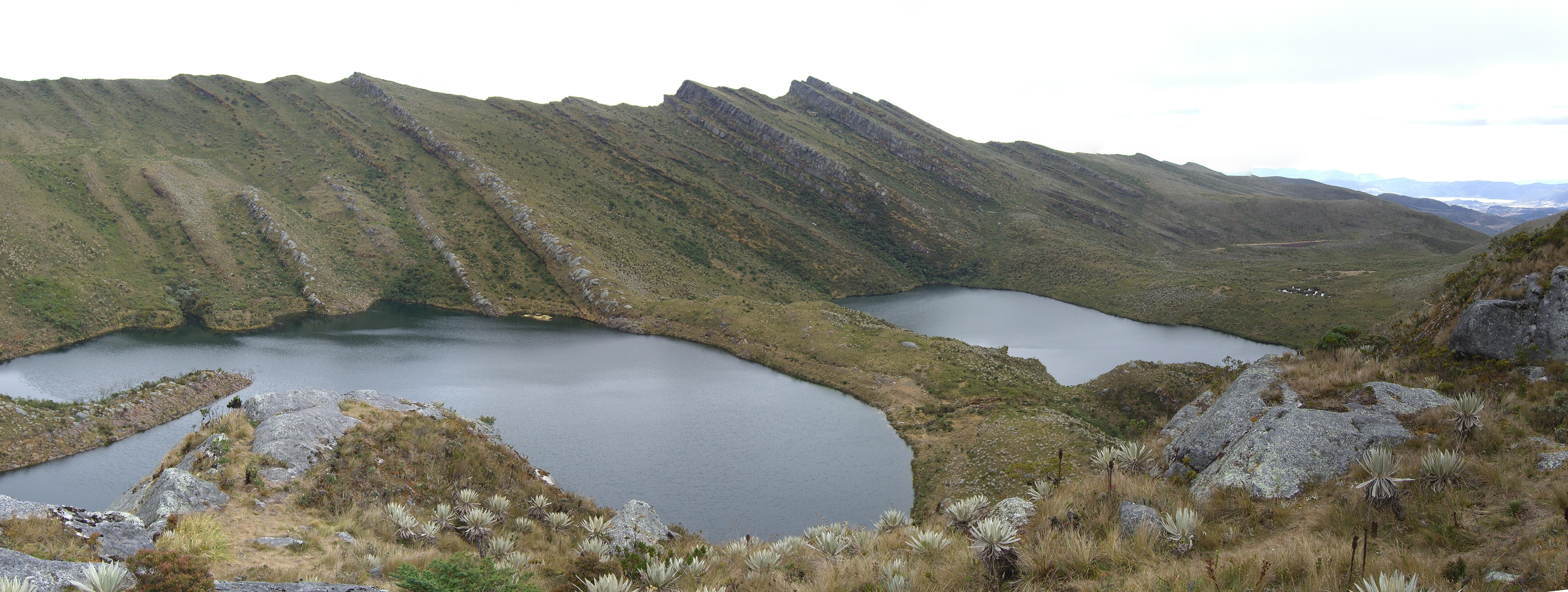
Siecha Lakes
