= Alepidocline =

Scientific classification
- Kingdom: Plantae
- Clade: Tracheophytes
- Clade: Angiosperms
- Clade: Eudicots
- Clade: Asterids
- Order: Asterales
- Family: Asteraceae
- Subfamily: Asteroideae
- Tribe: Millerieae
- Subtribe: Galinsoginae
- Genus: Alepidocline; S.F. Blake

Type species
- Alepidocline annua S.F. Blake

Synonyms
- Cuchumatanea Seid. & Beaman

Genus of flowering plants

Alepidocline is a genus of flowering plants in the family Asteraceae described as a genus in 1934.

Alepidocline is native to southern Mexico, Guatemala, and western Venezuela.

Species

- Alepidocline annua S.F. Blake - Chiapas, Guatemala, Táchira
- Alepidocline breedlovei (B.L.Turner) B.L. Turner - Chiapas
- Alepidocline macdonaldana B.L.Turner - Oaxaca
- Alepidocline macrocephala (H. Rob.) B.L. Turner - Mérida
- Alepidocline pochutlana B.L. Turner - Oaxaca
- Alepidocline trifida (J.J. Fay) B.L. Turner - Oaxaca
