= C15H10O8 =

The molecular formula C_{15}H_{10}O_{8} (molar mass : 318.23 g/mol, exact mass 318.037567) may refer to:

- Chiodectonic acid, a quinone
- Gossypetin, a flavonol
- Myricetin, a flavonol
- Quercetagetin, a flavonol
