= Ignacio Mariano Martinez de Galinsoga =

Spanish physician (1756–1797)

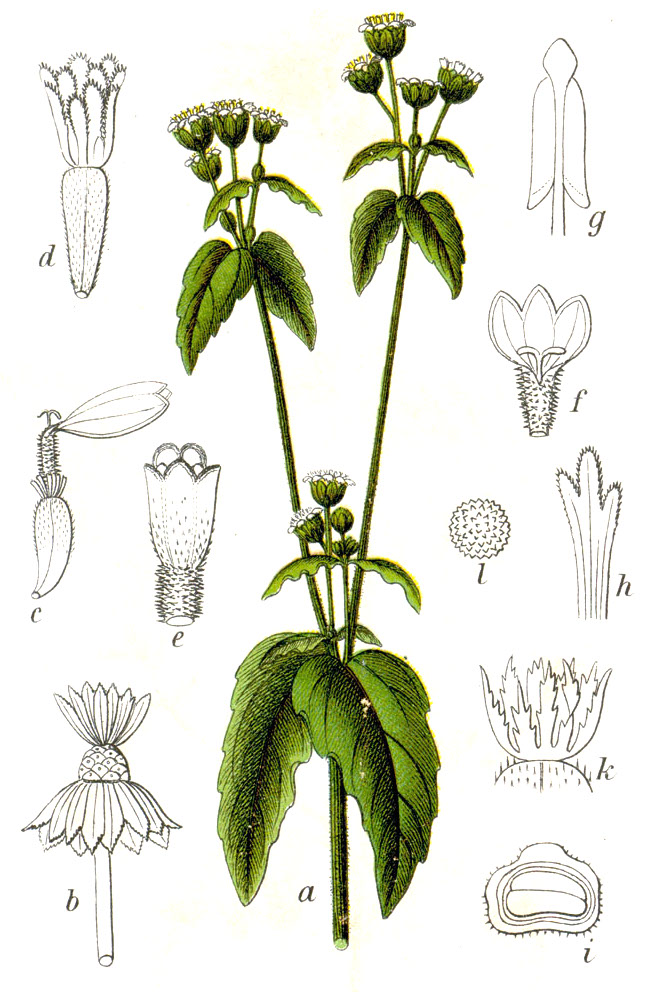
Galinsoga parviflora by Johann Georg Sturm

Ignacio Mariano Martinez de Galinsoga (1756 Lorca, Toledo - 1797) was the physician to the Spanish Queen consort Maria Luisa of Parma, director of the Real Jardín Botánico de Madrid, and a member of the Spanish Real Academia Nacional de Medicina. The botanical genus Galinsoga is named after him, while a street in Vélez Rubio (Almería) commemorates him.

Plants of the genus Galinsoga arrived in Europe from the Americas; by 1776 they were found in Kew Gardens and in 1794 in the Botanical Gardens of Paris and Madrid.

Galinsoga wrote a 1784 book titled "Demostración mecánica de las enfermedades que produce el uso de las cotillas" about the health hazards inherent in the wearing of corsets, and pointed out the absence of such health problems among peasant women.

== See also ==
- Corset controversy
