= Galinsoga spellenbergii =

Scientific classification
- Kingdom: Plantae
- Clade: Tracheophytes
- Clade: Angiosperms
- Clade: Eudicots
- Clade: Asterids
- Order: Asterales
- Family: Asteraceae
- Genus: Galinsoga
- Species: G. spellenbergii

Binomial name
- Galinsoga spellenbergii B.L.Turner 1986

Species of flowering plant

Galinsoga spellenbergii is a rare Mexican species of flowering plant in the family Asteraceae. It has been found only in the State of Durango in northern Mexico.

== Description ==
Galinsoga spellenbergii is a branching annual herb up to 20 cm (7.9 in) tall. Leaves are egg-shaped, up to 2.5 cm (0.98 in) long. Each head has about 5 white ray flowers surrounding a large number of yellow disc flowers.
