= Galinsoga boliviensis =

Scientific classification
- Kingdom: Plantae
- Clade: Tracheophytes
- Clade: Angiosperms
- Clade: Eudicots
- Clade: Asterids
- Order: Asterales
- Family: Asteraceae
- Genus: Galinsoga
- Species: G. boliviensis

Binomial name
- Galinsoga boliviensis Canne-Hill. 1977

Species of flowering plants in the daisy family

Galinsoga boliviensis is a rare Bolivian species of flowering plant in the family Asteraceae. It has been found in Oropeza Province in central Bolivia.

== Description ==
Galinsoga boliviensis is a branching annual herb up to 14 cm (5.5 in) tall. Leaves are up to 4.0 cm (1.6 in) long. Flower heads are up to 7 mm (0.28 in) across. Each head has 4-8 white (occasionally pink) ray flowers surrounding about 26 yellow disc flowers.
