= Galinsoga mollis =

Scientific classification
- Kingdom: Plantae
- Clade: Tracheophytes
- Clade: Angiosperms
- Clade: Eudicots
- Clade: Asterids
- Order: Asterales
- Family: Asteraceae
- Genus: Galinsoga
- Species: G. mollis

Binomial name
- Galinsoga mollis McVaugh 1972

Species of flowering plant

Galinsoga mollis is a rare Mexican species of flowering plant in the family Asteraceae. It has been found only in the State of Jalisco in western Mexico.

== Description ==
Galinsoga mollis is a branching annual herb up to 150 cm (4.9 ft) tall. Leaves are narrow and tapering to a point, up to 15 cm (5.9 in) long. Flower heads are up to 20 mm (0.79 in) across. Each head has about 8 white ray flowers surrounding as many as 150 yellow disc flowers.
