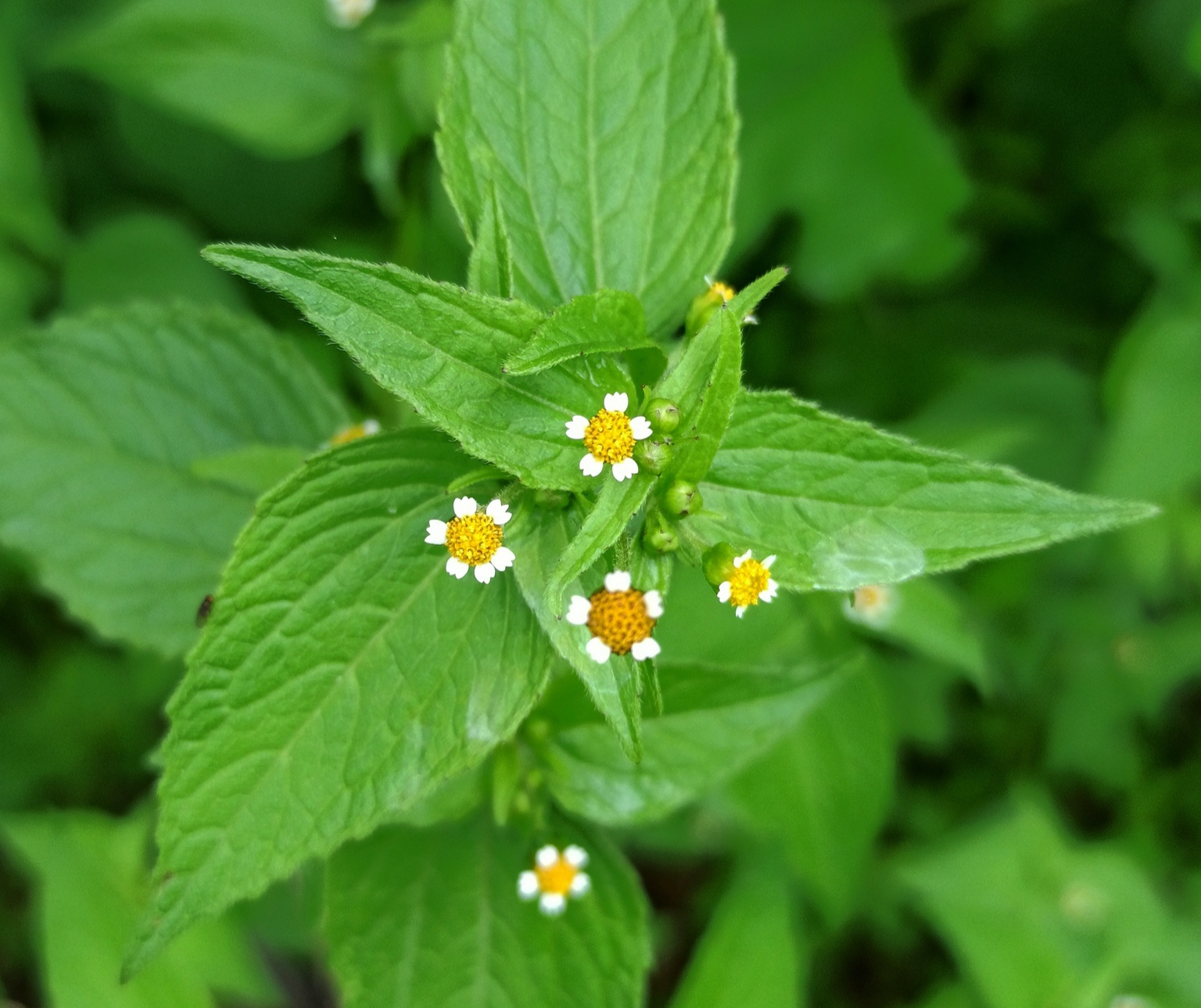

Conservation status
- Apparently Secure (NatureServe)

Scientific classification
- Kingdom: Plantae
- Clade: Tracheophytes
- Clade: Angiosperms
- Clade: Eudicots
- Clade: Asterids
- Order: Asterales
- Family: Asteraceae
- Genus: Galinsoga
- Species: G. parviflora

Binomial name
- Galinsoga parviflora Cav. 1796

Synonyms
- Species synonymy: Tridax parviflora; Wiborgia parviflora (Cav.) Kunth; Adventina parviflora (Cav.) Raf.; Baziasa microglossa Steud.; Galinsoga hirsuta Baker; Galinsoga laciniata Retz.; Galinsoga quinqueradiata Ruiz & Pav.; Sabazia microglossa DC.; Stemmatella sodiroi Hieron.; Vigolina acmella (Roth) Poir.; Wiborgia acmella Roth; Galinsoga semicalva (A.Gray) H.St.John & D.White

= Galinsoga parviflora =

Species of flowering plant in the daisy family

Galinsoga parviflora is a species of herbaceous plant in the daisy family Asteraceae. It has several common names including guasca (Colombia), pacpa yuyo, paco yuyo, and waskha (Peru), burrionera (Ecuador), albahaca silvestre and saetilla (Argentina), mielcilla (Costa Rica), piojito (Oaxaca, Mexico), galinsoga (New Zealand), gallant soldier, quickweed, and potato weed (United Kingdom, United States).

== History ==
Galinsoga parviflora was brought from Peru to Kew Gardens in 1796, and later escaped to the wild in Great Britain and Ireland, being temporarily known as the 'Kew Weed'. The plant is named after the Spanish botanist Ignacio Mariano Martinez de Galinsoga. The species name 'parviflora' translates to 'having small flowers'. In Britain, its name Galinsoga is sometimes popularly rendered as "gallant soldiers", and then sometimes altered to "soldiers of the Queen". In Malawi, where the plant is naturalised, it is known as 'Mwamuna aligone' which translates to 'my husband is sleeping'.

== Description ==
Galinsoga parviflora grows to a height of 75 cm (30 in). It is a branched herb with opposite stalked leaves, toothed at the margins. The flowers are in small heads. The 3–8 white ray-florets are about 10 mm (1/2 in) long and 3-lobed. The central disc florets are yellow and tubular.

== Identification ==
Gallant soldier is usually more-or-less glabrous, whereas the otherwise similar shaggy soldier tends to be very hairy, but these characters are insufficient for accurate identification. To be confident, it is important to check (with a hand lens) that gallant soldier has three-pointed tips to the scales on the receptacle, and scales in the pappus with smooth margins and a blunt point at the top.

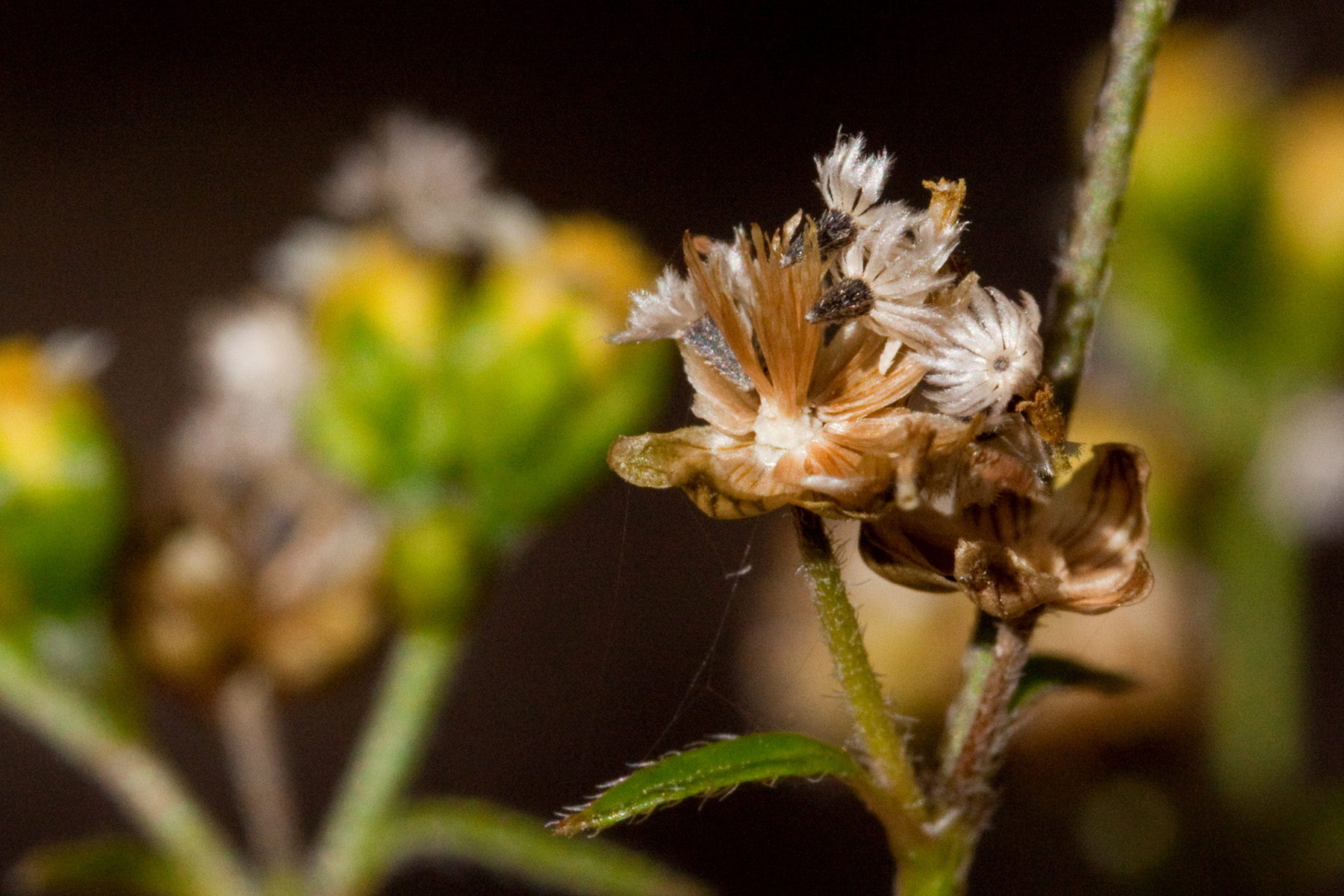
The pappus scales have smooth (not hairy) margins and a blunt tip.

== Distribution ==
The species is native to South America; however, it is widely naturalized in other countries. There are a few records of G. parviflora and G. quadriradiata in Northern Ireland. It has been naturalized elsewhere, including North America and Australasia.

== Uses ==
In Colombia it is used as a herb in the soup ajiaco. In Oaxaca, Mexico, it is used as an ingredient in sopa de guías, a soup made from squash vines, fresh corn and wild herbs. It can also be used as an ingredient in leaf salads, although its subtle flavour, reminiscent of artichoke, mostly develops after being cooked. In eastern Africa, the plant is collected from the wild, and its leaves, stem and flowers eaten. It is also dried and ground into powder for use in soups.

== Phytochemicals ==
In G. parviflora, the major phytochemicals are phenolic acids, depsides and flavonoids with their corresponding glycosides. The flavonoids present are patulitrin, quercimeritrin, quercetagetin, luteolin 7-β-D-glucopyranoside, apigenin 7-β-D-glucoside, galinsoside A, galinsoside B, 7,3',4'-trihydroxyflavanone and 3,5,7,3',4'-pentahydroxyflavanone. Phenolic acids and depsides includes vanillic acid, isovanillic acid, p-coumaric acid, p-hydroxybenzoic acid, o-hydroxyphenyl acetic acid, caffeic acid, chlorogenic acid and caffeoylglucaric acids.
