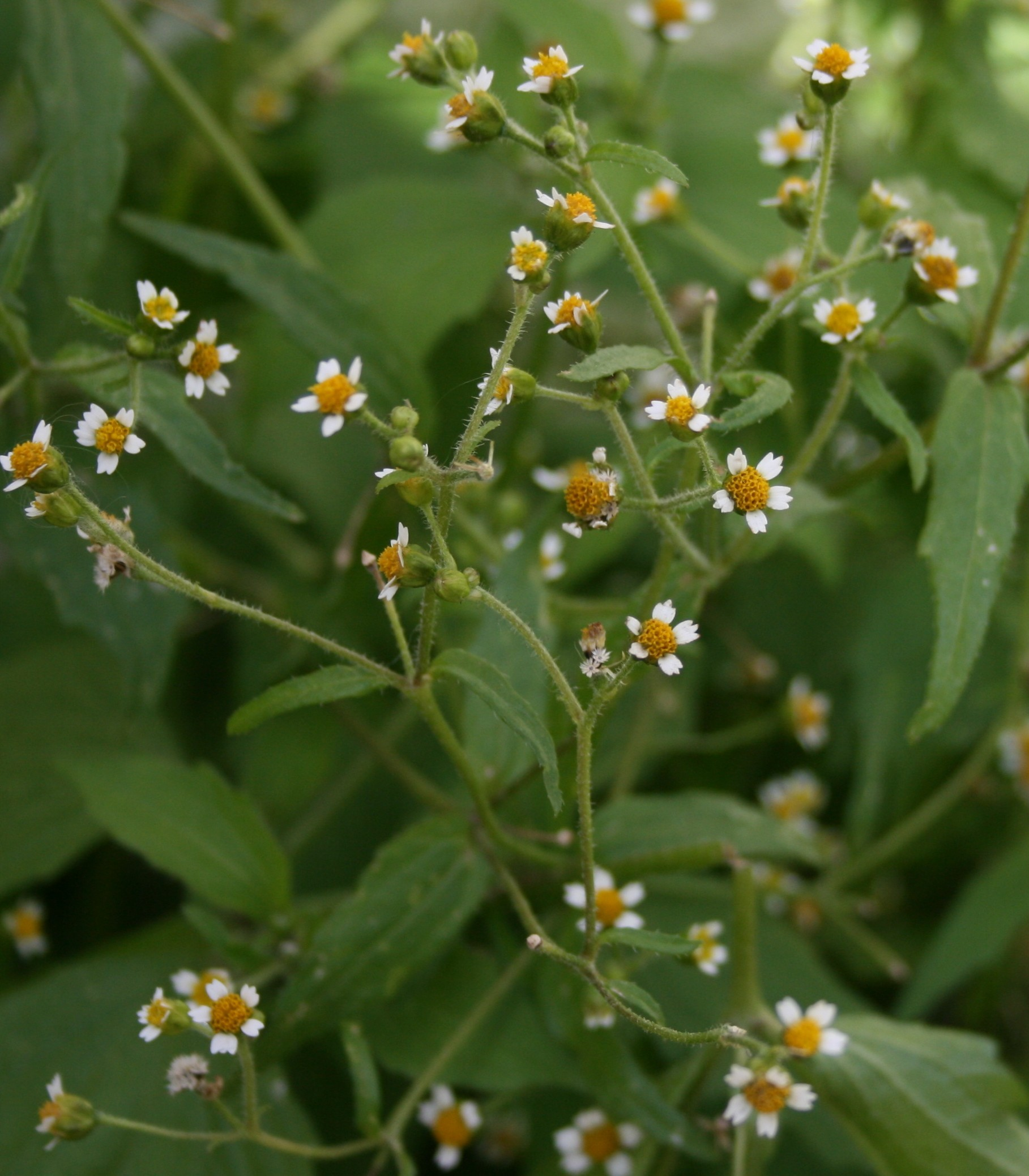

Scientific classification
- Kingdom: Plantae
- Clade: Embryophytes
- Clade: Tracheophytes
- Clade: Angiosperms
- Clade: Eudicots
- Clade: Asterids
- Order: Asterales
- Family: Asteraceae
- Genus: Galinsoga
- Species: G. quadriradiata

Binomial name
- Galinsoga quadriradiata Ruiz & Pav., 1798

Synonyms
- Synonymy: Adventina ciliata Raf.; Ageratum perplexans M.F.Johnson; Baziasa urticifolia (Kunth) Steud.; Galinsoga aristulata E.P.Bicknell; Galinsoga bicolorata H.St.John & D.White; Galinsoga brachystephana Regel; Galinsoga brachystephana Otto ex Heer & Regel; Galinsoga caracasana (DC.) Sch.Bip.; Galinsoga ciliata (Raf.) S.F.Blake; Galinsoga eligulata Cuatrec.; Galinsoga hispida Benth.; Galinsoga humboldtii Hieron.; Galinsoga plikeri Giacom.; Galinsoga urticifolia (Kunth) Benth.; Jaegeria urticaefolia (Kunth) Spreng.; Jaegeria urticifolia (Kunth) Spreng.; Sabazia urticifolia (Kunth) DC.; Stemmatella urticifolia (Kunth) O.Hoffm. ex Hieron.; Vargasia caracasana DC.; Wiborgia brachystephana Heynh.; Wilborgia urticifolia Kunth

= Galinsoga quadriradiata =

Species of flowering plant

Galinsoga quadriradiata is a species of flowering plant in the family Asteraceae which is known by several common names, including shaggy soldier, Peruvian daisy, hairy galinsoga. Despite the common name, the plant's native home is apparently central Mexico, although it has become an introduced species in many other places (North and South America, Europe, Japan, Philippines, the northern India, Nepal, etc.). It is sometimes considered a weed.

== Description ==
Shaggy soldier is an annual herb about 25 cm (10 in.) tall (exceptionally up to 80 cm) and opposite leaves. It is so highly branched that it produces two side shoots at just about every node. The stems, leaves and bracts are all sparsely to densely hairy, with a mixture of glandular and simple hairs. The lower leaves are ovate and about 5 to 9 cm long and toothed, while the upper ones are smaller and more lanceolate. They all have petioles about 1 cm long and lack stipules.

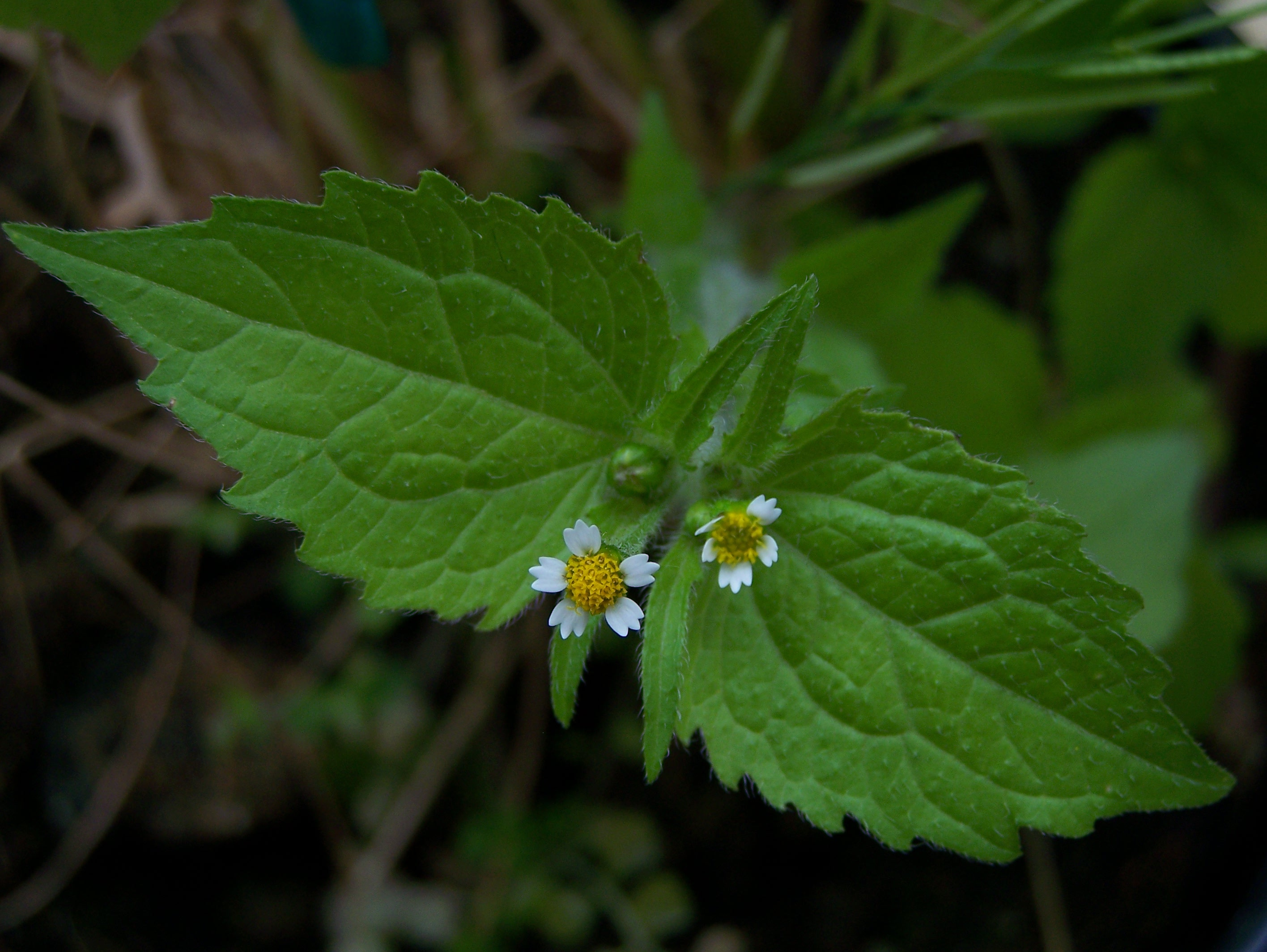
The leaves are ovate and toothed.

A typical plant will produce numerous flower heads, arranged in threes (technically, dichasial cymes) with 2 cm long peduncles at the tip of every branch. Each flower head is around 5 mm across and contains about 25 tiny (3 mm) yellow disc florets with five lobes at the ends, and five widely-spaced, larger (5 mm), petal-like, white ray florets with 2 or 3 crenate teeth. Both the disc and ray florets are fertile, but the disc florets are bisexual while the ray florets are female.

The fruits are 1 to 1.5 mm long brown to black achenes, tapered at the base and awned with a white pappus.

== Identification ==
Shaggy soldier is usually a hairy plant, whereas the otherwise similar gallant soldier tends to be more-or-less hairless, but these characters are insufficient for accurate identification. To be confident, it is important to check (with a hand lens) that shaggy soldier has simple (not forked) scales on the receptacle, and scales in the pappus with hairy margins and a long, thin point at the top.

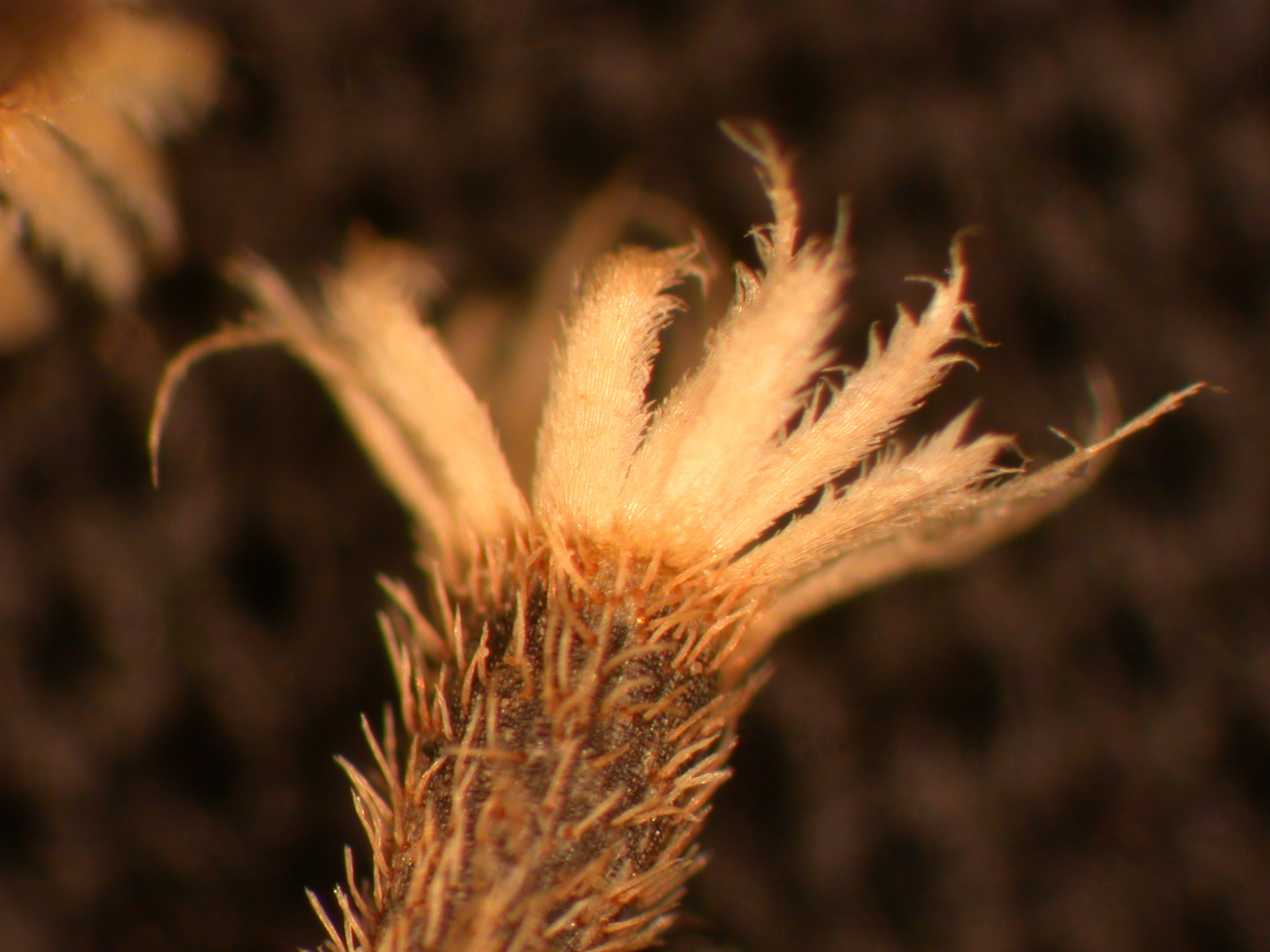
The pappus scales have fringed margins and an elongated, fine tip.

In the seedling phase, the plant has very short hypocotyls and smooth, club-shaped cotyledons with a slightly indented apex.

== Uses ==
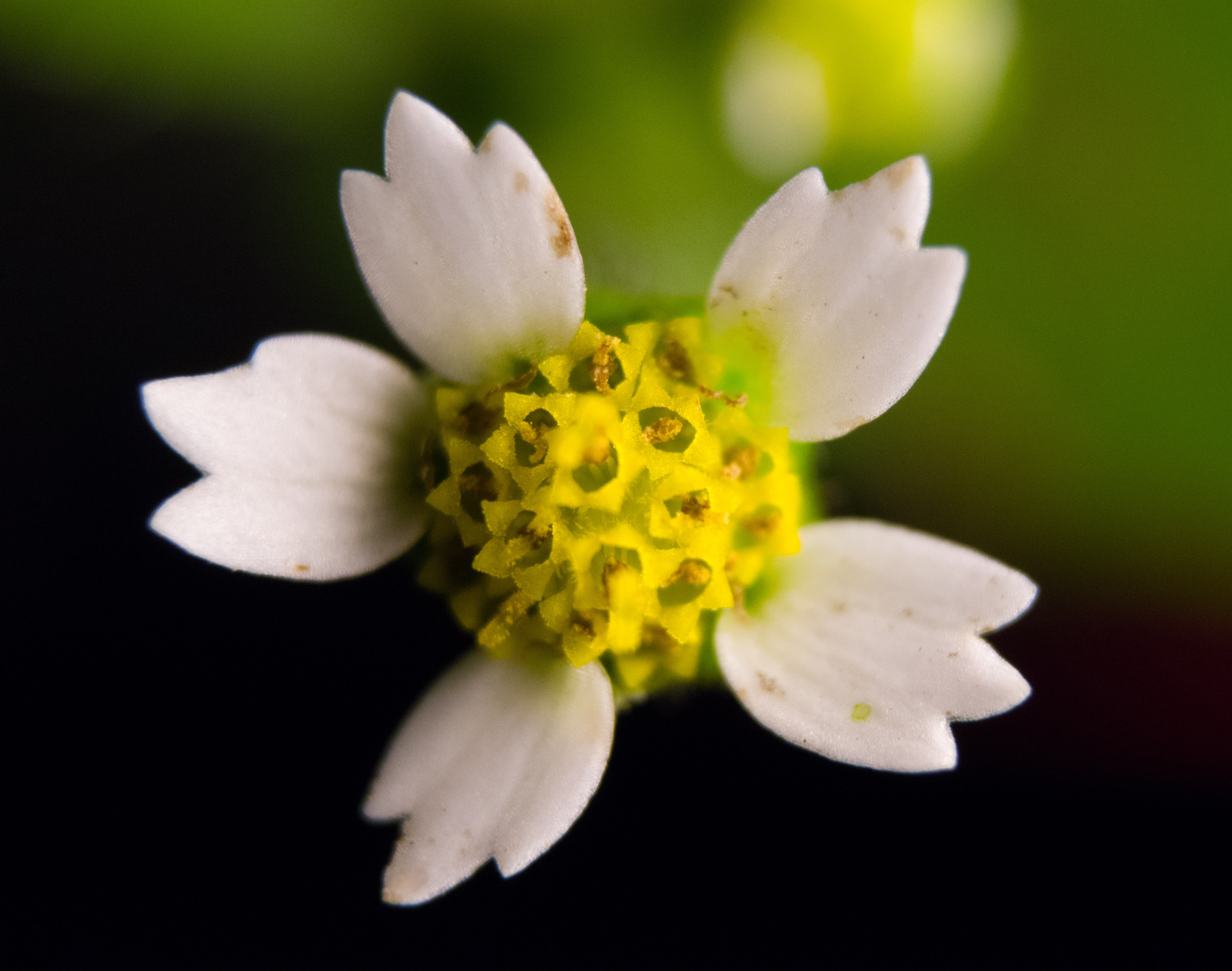
Macro photograph of a shaggy soldier flower showing ray and disk florets.

Galinsoga quadriradiata and its cousin Galinsoga parviflora are both edible and can be used as a pot herb or in salads, although outside of their native range they have not been widely adopted as a culinary item other than in China. G. parviflora is preferred as a salad green due to its non-hairy leaves. If you happen to live in a tropical region, care must be taken to not confuse them with the distantly related, and visually similar, Tridax procumbens.
