= Galinsoga mandonii =

Scientific classification
- Kingdom: Plantae
- Clade: Tracheophytes
- Clade: Angiosperms
- Clade: Eudicots
- Clade: Asterids
- Order: Asterales
- Family: Asteraceae
- Genus: Galinsoga
- Species: G. mandonii

Binomial name
- Galinsoga mandonii Sch.Bip. 1866

Species of flowering plant

Galinsoga mandonii is a South American species of flowering plant in the family Asteraceae. It has been found in Peru, Bolivia, and far northwestern Argentina.

== Description ==
Galinsoga mandonii is a branching annual herb up to 66 cm (26 in) tall. Leaves are up to 5.0 cm (2.0 in) long. Flower heads are up to 6.5 mm (0.26 in) across. Each head has 3-9 white or dark purple ray flowers surrounding about 5-40 yellow or purple disc flowers.
