= Siecha Lakes =

Group of lakes in Cundinamarca, Colombia

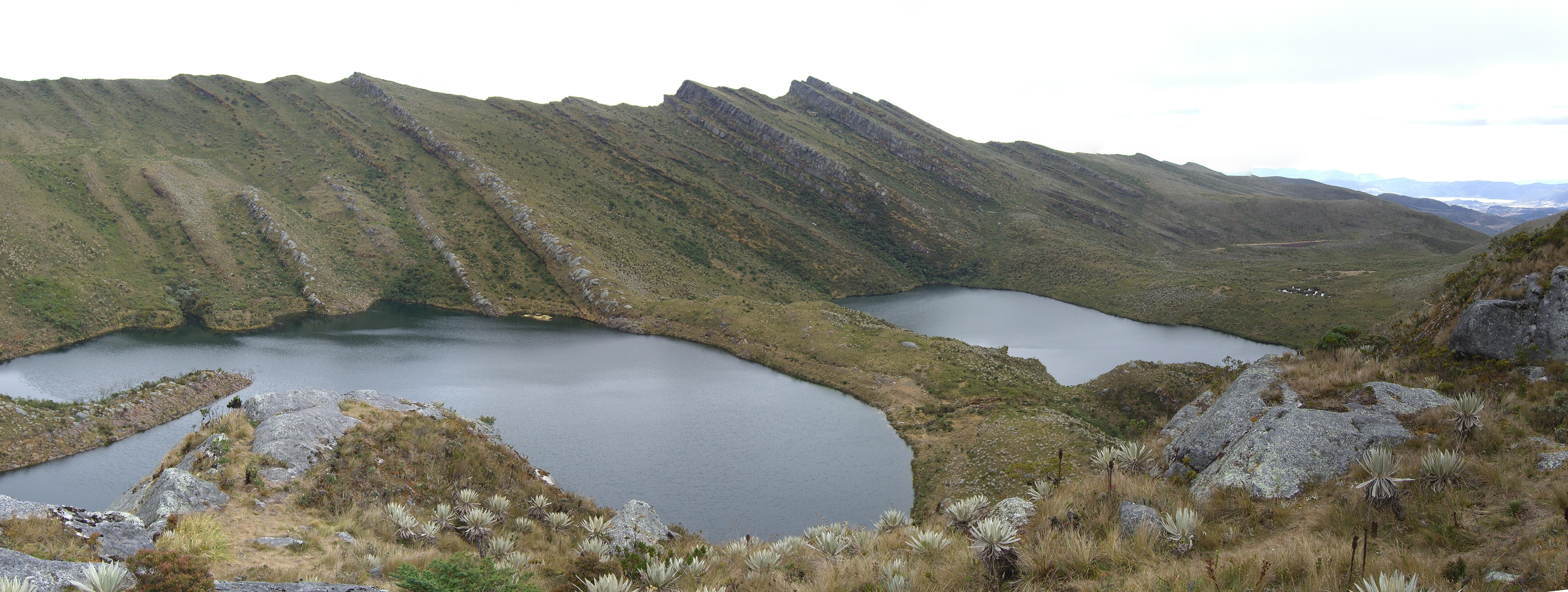
- Siecha Lakes, from left (east) to right (west); Siecha, Guasca, De los Patos

- Location within Colombia
- Location: Guasca, Cundinamarca
- Coordinates: 4°45′52″N 73°51′04″W
- Type: Glacial
- Part of: Chingaza Natural National Park
- Basin countries: Colombia
- Surface area: 141,401 m^{2} (1,522,030 sq ft)
- Max. depth: 25 m (82 ft)
- Surface elevation: 3,590 m (11,780 ft)

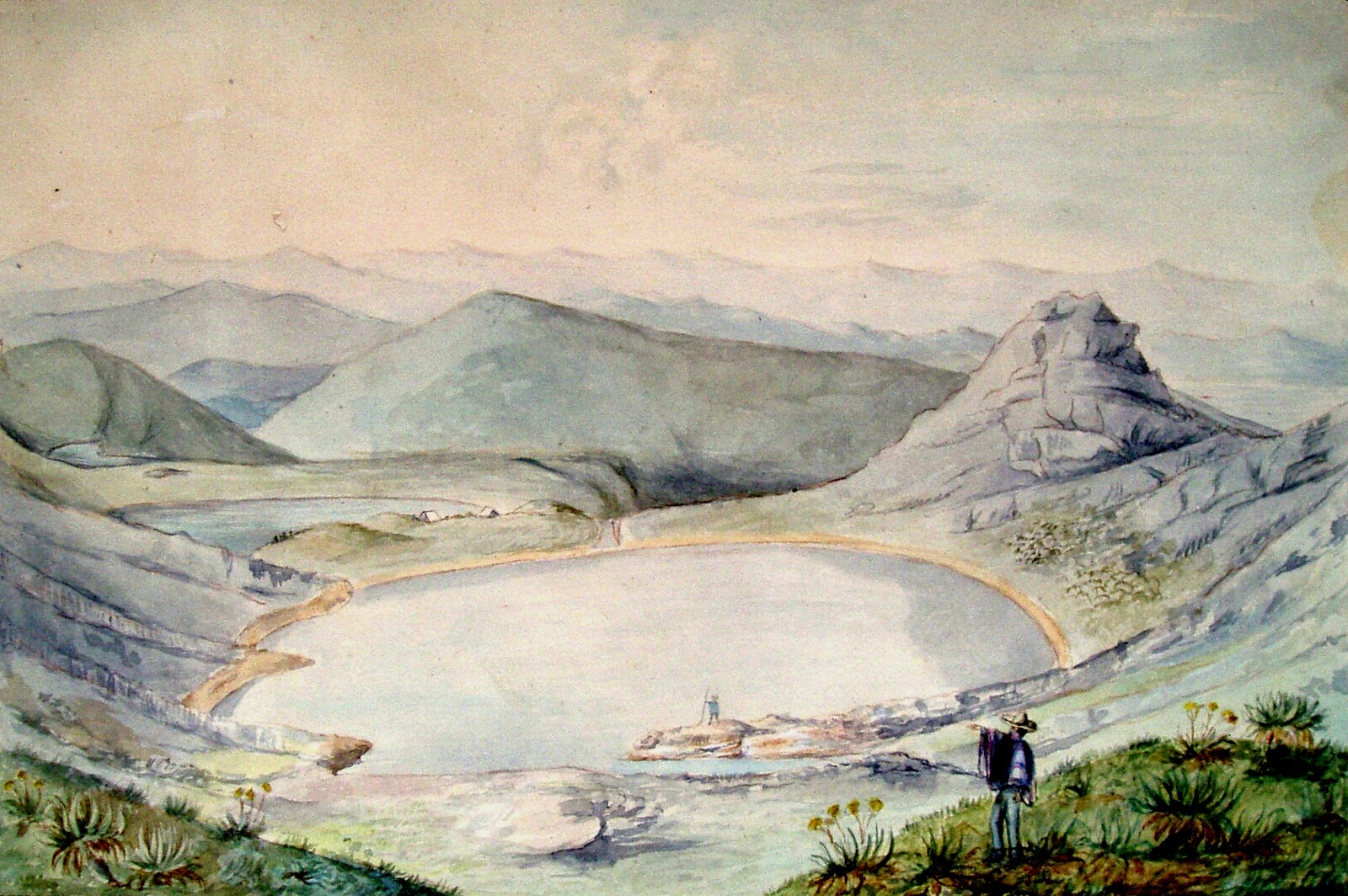
Painting of Lake Siecha, 1855

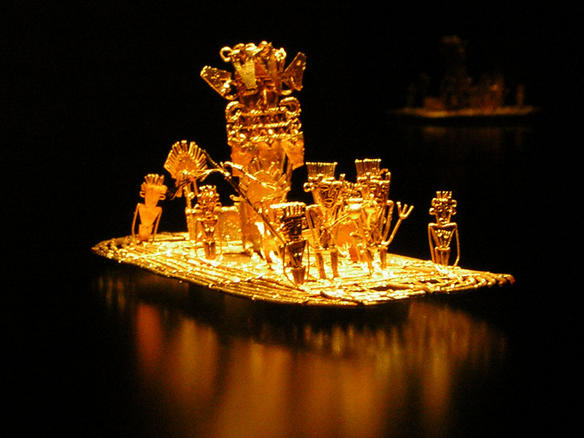
Famous Muisca raft a similar raft was found in Lake Siecha but lost due to fire of the ship in the harbour of Bremen

The Siecha Lakes are three glacial lakes located in the Chingaza Natural National Park in Cundinamarca, Colombia. The Andean lakes are considered sacred in the religion of the Muisca who inhabited the area before the Spanish conquest of the Muisca in the 1530s.

== Geography ==
The Siecha Lakes are a group of high-altitude lakes located in the Eastern Andes of Colombia. They are situated within the Chingaza National Natural Park.

=== Location ===
The lakes are found in the department of Cundinamarca, northeast of Bogotá, at an elevation of approximately 3,600 meters above sea level.

=== Physical characteristics ===
The Siecha Lakes consist of three main glacial lakes. They were formed by glacial activity during the last Ice Age.

== Climate ==
The area has a cold páramo climate, with frequent rainfall, low temperatures, and strong winds throughout the year.

Historical significance

The Siecha Lakes were sacred to the Muisca people. According to historical accounts, offerings of gold were made in the lakes as part of religious ceremonies. These traditions are sometimes connected to the legend of El Dorado.

== Flora and fauna ==
The surrounding páramo ecosystem is home to endemic plant species, including frailejones, as well as various bird and mammal species.

== Tourism ==
Today, the lakes are a popular destination for hiking and ecotourism within Chingaza National Natural Park.

== Etymology ==
In the Chibcha language of the Muisca Siecha means "Water Man" or "Man of Water".

== Description ==
The Siecha Lakes consist of three small glacial lakes, from large to small and east to west; Siecha (63,893 m^{2}), Guasca (56,846 m^{2}) and De los Patos (20,662 m^{2}). Alternative names for the smaller two are Fausto and America. The lakes belong to the municipality of Guasca. Fauna around the lakes are the birds American purple gallinule, helmeted curassow, torrent duck, Andean cock-of-the-rock, eagles and orange-fronted parakeet. In the lakes the birds Oxyura jamaicensis andina, Andean teal and the American coot can be found. Mammals around the lakes include the spectacled bear, white-tailed deer, red deer and the little red brocket.

=== History ===
In the colonial period, the lakes were partly drained to extract the golden artefacts of the Muisca from the water. In 1855 a golden raft was found in one of the lakes, similar to the famous Muisca raft. It was named Balsa de Siecha or "Siecha raft" and pictured in the book El Dorado by Muisca scholar Liborio Zerda in 1883. The discovery of the raft made Zerda believe that the site of the initiation ritual of the new zipa was not in Lake Guatavita, yet in the Siecha Lakes. Later, the raft was more-or-less legally taken from Colombia to Europe. The transporting ship burnt in the harbour of Bremen and the raft was lost.

=== Tourism ===
To visit the lakes certain rules apply; visits are only possible on Saturdays and Sundays, access at the entrance point needs to be not later than 10:00 AM and exit not after 4:00 PM. A maximum of 30 visitors per day is allowed.

== See also ==
- Liborio Zerda
- Muisca religion
- Lake Guatavita, Lake Iguaque, Lake Tota
