= Galinsoga longipes =

Scientific classification
- Kingdom: Plantae
- Clade: Tracheophytes
- Clade: Angiosperms
- Clade: Eudicots
- Clade: Asterids
- Order: Asterales
- Family: Asteraceae
- Genus: Galinsoga
- Species: G. longipes

Binomial name
- Galinsoga longipes Canne-Hill. 1977

Species of flowering plant

Galinsoga longipes is a Mexican species of flowering plant in the family Asteraceae. It has been found in the States of Michoacán, México, Morelos, and Guerrero in western and central Mexico.

== Description ==
Galinsoga longipes is a branching annual herb up to 55 cm (22 in) tall. Leaves are 6.0 cm (2.4 in) long. Flower heads are up to 15 mm (0.6 in) across. Each head has 5 white ray flowers surrounding 35-100 yellow disc flowers.
