= Galinsoga triradiata =

Scientific classification
- Kingdom: Plantae
- Clade: Tracheophytes
- Clade: Angiosperms
- Clade: Eudicots
- Clade: Asterids
- Order: Asterales
- Family: Asteraceae
- Genus: Galinsoga
- Species: G. triradiata

Binomial name
- Galinsoga triradiata Canne-Hill. 1977

Species of flowering plant

Galinsoga triradiata is a rare Mexican species of flowering plant in the family Asteraceae. It has been found only in the State of Michoacán in western Mexico.

== Description ==
Galinsoga triradiata is a branching annual herb up to 75 cm (30 in) tall. Leaves are egg-shaped, up to 6.5 cm (2.6 in) long. Flower heads are up to 13 mm (0.51 in) across. Each head has about 3-5 white ray flowers surrounding as 25-35 yellow disc flowers.
