= Galinsoga caligensis =

Scientific classification
- Kingdom: Plantae
- Clade: Tracheophytes
- Clade: Angiosperms
- Clade: Eudicots
- Clade: Asterids
- Order: Asterales
- Family: Asteraceae
- Genus: Galinsoga
- Species: G. caligensis

Binomial name
- Galinsoga caligensis Canne-Hill. 1977

Species of plant

Galinsoga caligensis is a Peruvian species of flowering plant in the family Asteraceae. It has been found in the coastal desert regions of west-central Peru, in the Lima Region.

== Description ==
Galinsoga caligensis is a branching annual herb up to 40 cm (16 in) tall. Leaves are egg-shaped, up to 6 cm (2.4 in) long. Flower heads about 10 mm (0.39 in) across. Each head has 4-8 white ray flowers surrounding 35-75 yellow disc flowers.
