= Galinsoga macrocephala =

Scientific classification
- Kingdom: Plantae
- Clade: Tracheophytes
- Clade: Angiosperms
- Clade: Eudicots
- Clade: Asterids
- Order: Asterales
- Family: Asteraceae
- Genus: Galinsoga
- Species: G. macrocephala

Binomial name
- Galinsoga macrocephala H.Rob. 1979 not B.L.Rob. 1979

Synonyms
- Alepidocline macrocephala (H. Rob.) B.L. Turner

Species of flowering plant

Galinsoga macrocephala is a South American species of flowering plant in the family Asteraceae. It has been found only in Venezuela.

== Description ==
Galinsoga macrocephala is a branching annual herb up to 30 (12 inches) tall. Stems are purple with white hairs. Leaves are opposite, egg-shaped, up to 20 mm (0.79 in) long. Flower heads are somewhat larger than in many related species, about 7–8 mm (0.28–0.31 in) across. Each head has about 14 reddish-purple ray flowers surrounding about 25 yellow disc flowers.
