= Galinsoga formosa =

Scientific classification
- Kingdom: Plantae
- Clade: Tracheophytes
- Clade: Angiosperms
- Clade: Eudicots
- Clade: Asterids
- Order: Asterales
- Family: Asteraceae
- Genus: Galinsoga
- Species: G. formosa

Binomial name
- Galinsoga formosa Canne-Hill. 1977

Synonyms
- Sabazia trifida J.J.Fay 1973 not Galinsoga trifida Pers. 1803; Alepidocline trifida (J.J.Fay) B.L.Turner

Species of flowering plant

Galinsoga formosa is a rare Mexican species of flowering plant in the family Asteraceae. It has been found only the State of Oaxaca in southwestern Mexico.

== Description ==
Galinsoga formosa is a branching annual herb up to 100 cm (39 in) tall. Leaves are up to 11 cm (4.3 in) long. Flower heads are up to 22 mm (0.87 in) across. Each head has 5-15 white (sometimes with a purplish underside) ray flowers surrounding up to 100 yellow disc flowers.
