= Galinsoga durangensis =

Scientific classification
- Kingdom: Plantae
- Clade: Tracheophytes
- Clade: Angiosperms
- Clade: Eudicots
- Clade: Asterids
- Order: Asterales
- Family: Asteraceae
- Genus: Galinsoga
- Species: G. durangensis

Binomial name
- Galinsoga durangensis (Longpre) Canne-Hill. 1977

Synonyms
- Tricarpha durangensis Longpre 1970; Sabazia durangensis (Longpre) Urbatsch & B.L. Turner 1975

Species of flowering plant

Galinsoga durangensis is a rare Mexican species of flowering plant in the family Asteraceae. It has been found in the States of Durango and Sinaloa in northwestern Mexico.

== Description ==
Galinsoga durangensis is a branching annual herb up to 66 cm (26 in) tall. Leaves are up to 8 cm (3.1 in) long. Flower heads are up to 2 cm (0.79 in) across. Each head has 8-13 ray flowers surrounding about 30-65 disc flowers.
