= Ajiaco =

Colombian potato soup

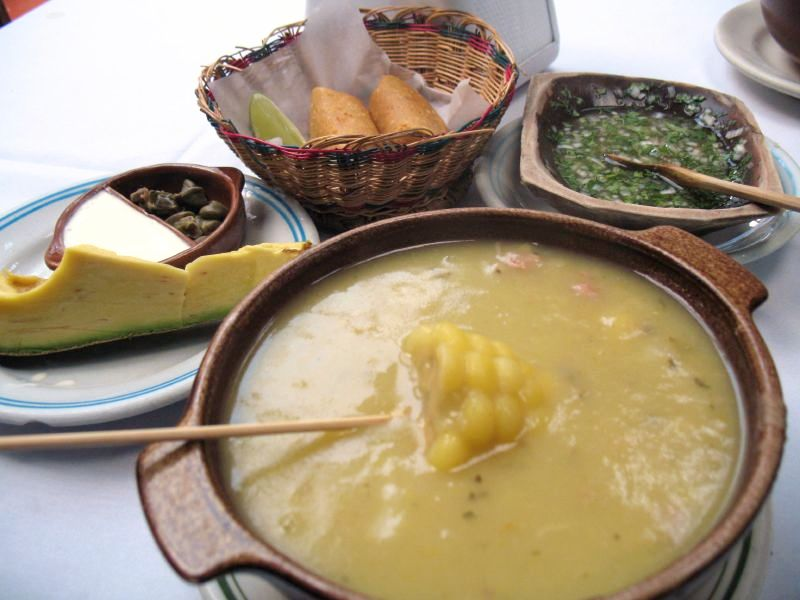
- Ajiaco is one of the most representative dishes of Bogotá, Colombia.
- Type: Soup
- Place of origin: Pre-Columbian era
- Region or state: Latin America
- Main ingredients: Potatoes, chicken

Ajiaco (Spanish pronunciation: [aˈxjako]) is a soup common to Colombia, Cuba, and Peru. Scholars have debated the origin of the dish. The dish is especially popular in the Colombian capital, Bogotá, being called ajiaco santafereño, where it is typically made with chicken, three varieties of potatoes, and the herb Galinsoga parviflora, known locally as guasca or guascas. In Cuba, ajiaco is prepared as a stew, while in Peru the dish is prepared with a number of regionally specific variations.

== History ==
The exact origin of this dish has been debated by scholars. In his book Lexicografia Antillana, former president of Cuba Alfredo Zayas y Alfonso stated that the word "ajiaco" derived from "aji", the native Taíno word for "hot pepper." Cuban ethnologist Fernando Ortiz stated that ajiaco was a meal typical of the Taíno, and was an appropriate metaphor for Cuba being a melting pot. In the Cuban city of Camagüey, the San Juan festival begins with the making and serving of ajiaco. La Calle magazine of Cuba stated that the inhabitants of the village of Santa María de Puerto del Príncipe began the tradition of making ajiaco using their own cooking ingredients, donations from passersby, surplus from farmers, and surplus slave provisions. Ajiaco is believed to have become popular in Cuba during the 16th century, particularly among rural Cubans, although it was occasionally enjoyed by the upper class.

== Preparation ==
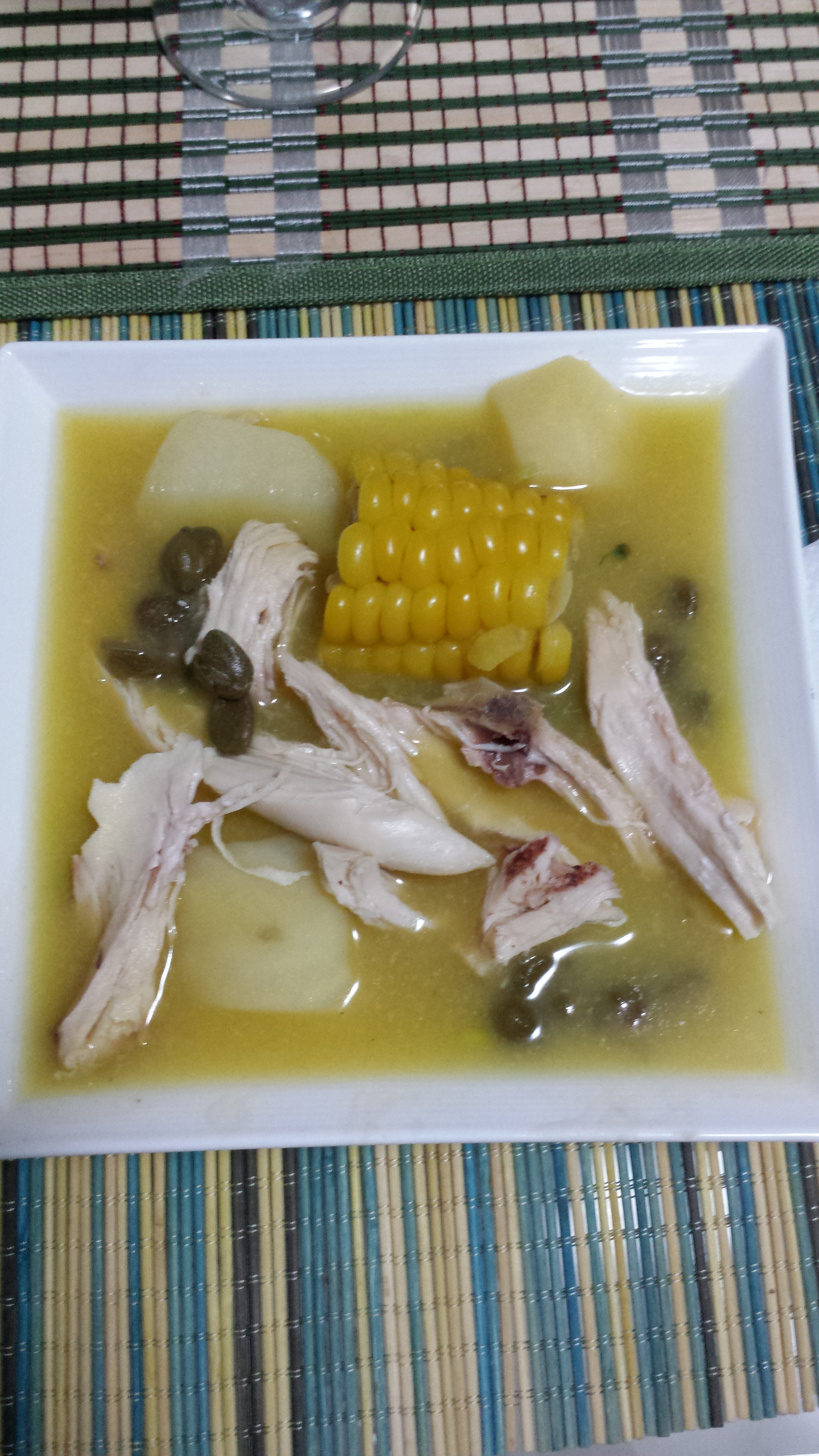
Ajiaco in Bogotá, Colombia

=== Colombia ===
In the Colombian capital of Bogotá, ajiaco is a popular dish typically made with chicken, three varieties of potatoes, and the Galinsoga parviflora herb, commonly referred to in Colombia as guasca or guascas, and in the U.S., where it is considered a weed, as gallant soldier. It can be garnished with capers, avocado slices, pieces of corn on the cob, or cream.

=== Cuba ===
In Cuba, ajiaco is a hearty stew made from beef, pork, chicken, vegetables, and a variety of starchy roots and tubers classified as viandas.

=== Peru ===
In Peru, ajiaco is a quite different dish of potatoes cooked with garlic, a mix of dried yellow and red chilies (aji mirasol and aji panca), hierba buena, and huacatay, generally accompanied by rice and stewed chicken or rabbit.

=== Chile ===
In Chile, ajiaco is a food of northern origin, it contains beef, onion, carrot and paprika, garlic and colored chili, potatoes and seasonings, powdered rib broth and coriander/parsley.

== See also ==
- List of soups
- List of potato dishes
