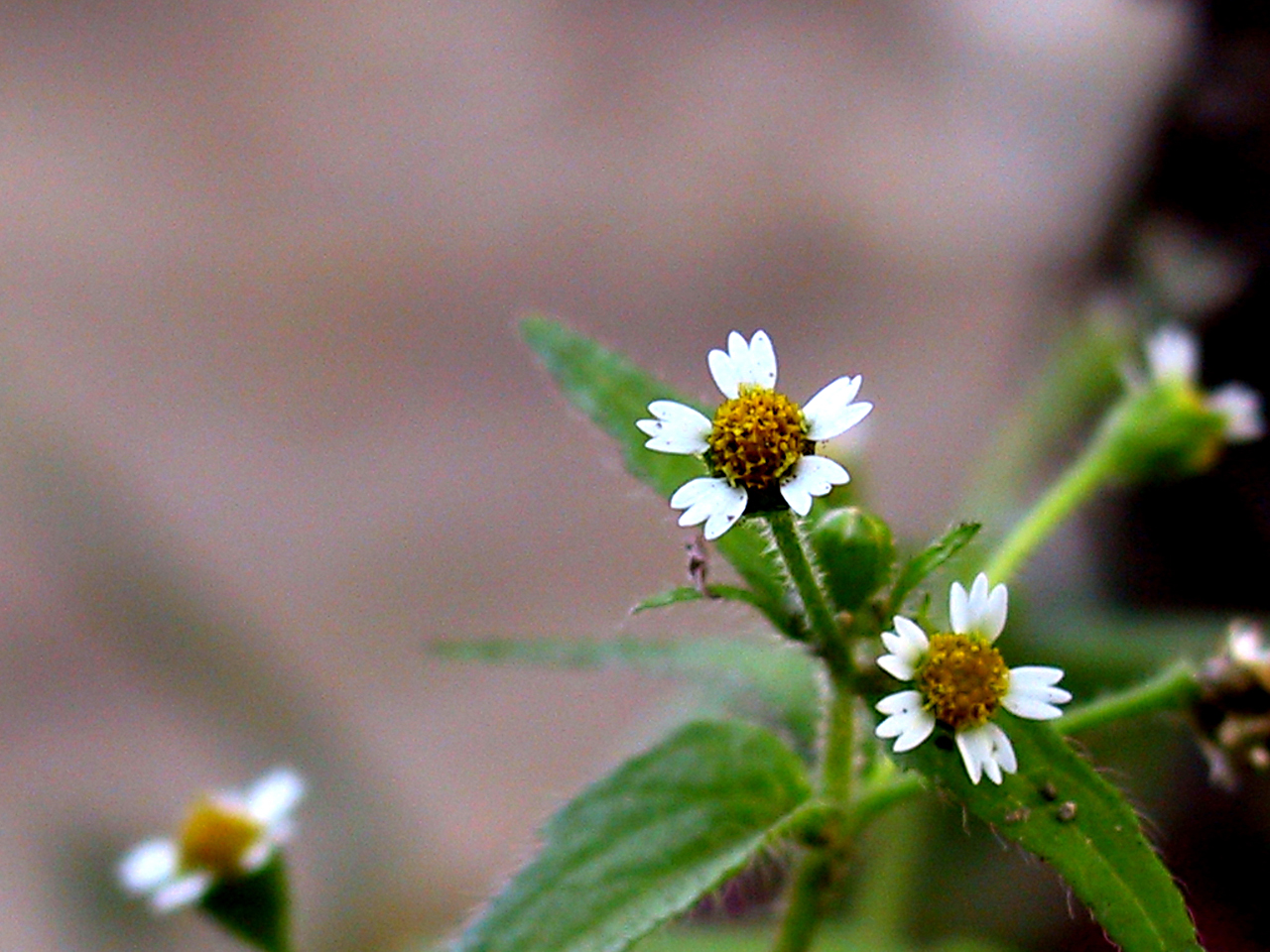
- Galinsoga quadriradiata

Scientific classification
- Kingdom: Plantae
- Clade: Embryophytes
- Clade: Tracheophytes
- Clade: Angiosperms
- Clade: Eudicots
- Clade: Asterids
- Order: Asterales
- Family: Asteraceae
- Subfamily: Asteroideae
- Tribe: Millerieae
- Subtribe: Galinsoginae
- Genus: Galinsoga; Ruiz & Pav.

Type species
- Galinsoga parviflora Cav.

Synonyms
- Gallinsoga St.Hil.; Stenocarpha S.F.Blake; Wiborgia Roth; Stematella Wedd. ex Sch.Bip.; Galinsogaea Himpel; Viborgia Spreng.; Galinsogea Willd.; Stemmatella Wedd. ex Benth. & Hook.f.; Vigolina Poir.; Adventina Raf.; Galinsoja Roth; Vargasia DC.

= Galinsoga =

Genus of flowering plants in the daisy family

Galinsoga is a genus of flowering plants in the family Asteraceae. It is native to North and South America and the West Indies, and naturalized in Europe, Asia, Africa, and Australia.

The name Galinsoga was dedicated to Ignacio Mariano Martinez de Galinsoga, who founded the Spanish Real Academia Nacional de Medicina and was director of the Real Jardín Botánico de Madrid.

Species

- Galinsoga amboensis D.L.Schulz
- Galinsoga boliviensis Canne-Hill.
- Galinsoga caligensis Canne-Hill.
- Galinsoga calva Rusby
- Galinsoga crozierae Panero
- Galinsoga durangensis (Longpre) Canne-Hill.
- Galinsoga formosa Canne-Hill.
- Galinsoga longipes Canne
- Galinsoga macrocephala H.Rob.
- Galinsoga mandonii Sch.Bip.
- Galinsoga mollis McVaugh
- Galinsoga parviflora Cav.
- Galinsoga quadriradiata Ruiz & Pav.
- Galinsoga spellenbergii B.L.Turner
- Galinsoga subdiscoidea Cronquist
- Galinsoga triradiata Canne-Hill.
