= Quercetagetin =

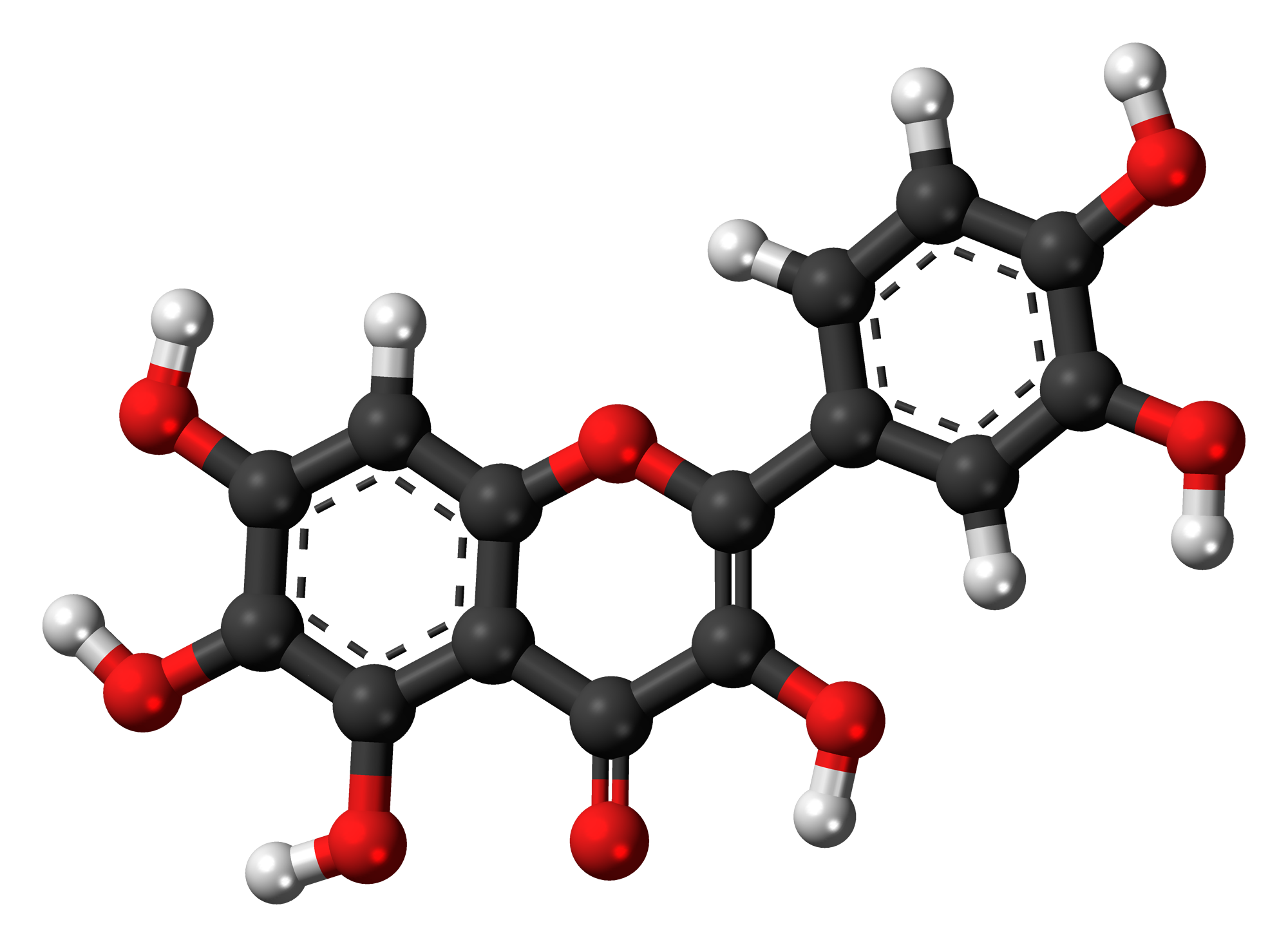

Names
- IUPAC name 3,3′,4′,5,6,7-Hexahydroxyflavone
- Systematic IUPAC name 2-(3,4-Dihydroxyphenyl)-3,5,6,7-tetrahydroxy-4H-1-benzopyran-4-one
- Other names 6-Hydroxyquercetin

Identifiers
CAS Number	90-18-6
3D model (JSmol)	Interactive image
ChEBI	CHEBI:8695
ChEMBL	ChEMBL413552
ChemSpider	4444999
ECHA InfoCard	100.001.794
EC Number	201-973-6
KEGG	C10122
PubChem CID	5281680
UNII	SV68G507VO
CompTox Dashboard (EPA)	DTXSID80237978
- InChI: InChI=1S/C15H10O8/c16-6-2-1-5(3-7(6)17)15-14(22)13(21)10-9(23-15)4-8(18)11(19)12(10)20/h1-4,16-20,22H Key: ZVOLCUVKHLEPEV-UHFFFAOYSA-N; InChI=1/C15H10O8/c16-6-2-1-5(3-7(6)17)15-14(22)13(21)10-9(23-15)4-8(18)11(19)12(10)20/h1-4,16-20,22H Key: ZVOLCUVKHLEPEV-UHFFFAOYAZ
- SMILES: C1=CC(=C(C=C1C2=C(C(=O)C3=C(C(=C(C=C3O2)O)O)O)O)O)O

Properties
Chemical formula	C_{15}H_{10}O_{8}
Molar mass	318.23 g/mol
- Except where otherwise noted, data are given for materials in their standard state (at 25 °C [77 °F], 100 kPa). verify (what is ?) Infobox references

Quercetagetin is a flavonol, a type of flavonoid. It can be found in the genus Eriocaulon.

== Glycosides ==
Quercetagetin-6-O-β-D-glucopyranoside from Tagetes mandonii.
