= List of flag bearers for Colombia at the Olympics =

Colombia at the Olympics
- IOC code: COL
- NOC: Colombian Olympic Committee
- Website: www.olimpicocol.co (in Spanish)
- Medals Ranked 71st: Gold 5 Silver 16 Bronze 17 Total 38

Summer appearances
- 1932; 1936; 1948; 1952; 1956; 1960; 1964; 1968; 1972; 1976; 1980; 1984; 1988; 1992; 1996; 2000; 2004; 2008; 2012; 2016; 2020; 2024

Winter appearances
- 2010; 2014; 2018; 2022; 2026

This is a list of flag bearers who have represented Colombia at the Olympics.

Flag bearers carry the national flag of their country at the opening ceremony of the Olympic Games.

#	Event year	Season	Flag bearer	Sport	Ref.
1	1932	Summer	Jorge Perry	Athletics	
2	1936	Summer	José Domingo Sánchez	Athletics	
3	1956	Summer	Jaime Aparicio	Athletics	
4	1960	Summer	Emilio Echeverry	Fencing	
5	1964	Summer	Emilio Echeverry	Fencing	
6	1968	Summer	Ricardo González	Swimming	
7	1972	Summer	Alfonso Pérez	Boxing	
8	1976	Summer	Helmult Bellingrodt	Shooting	
9	1980	Summer	Enrique Peña	Race walking	
10	1984	Summer	Pablo Restrepo	Swimming	
11	1988	Summer	Jorge Molina	Shooting	
12	1992	Summer	Bernardo Tovar	Shooting	
13	1996	Summer	Marlon Pérez Arango	Cycling	
14	2000	Summer	María Isabel Urrutia	Weightlifting	
15	2004	Summer	Carmenza Delgado	Weightlifting	
16	2008	Summer	María Luisa Calle	Cycling	
17	2010	Winter	Cynthia Denzler	Alpine skiing	
18	2012	Summer	Mariana Pajón	Cycling	
19	2016	Summer	Yuri Alvear	Judo	
20	2018	Winter	Pedro Causil	Speed skating	
21	2020	Summer	Caterine Ibargüen	Athletics	
21	2020	Summer	Yuberjen Martínez	Boxing	
22	2022	Winter	Laura Gómez	Speed skating	
22	2022	Winter	Carlos Andres Quintana	Cross-country skiing	
23	2024	Summer	Flor Ruiz	Athletics	
23	2024	Summer	Kevin Quintero	Cycling	

== See also ==
- Colombia at the Olympics
