= Colombia at the 2028 Summer Olympics =

- IOC code: COL
- NOC: Colombian Olympic Committee
- Website: www.olimpicocol.co (in Spanish)

in Los Angeles, United States 14 July 2028 – 30 July 2028
- Competitors: 18 in 1 sport
- Medals: Gold 0 Silver 0 Bronze 0 Total 0

Summer Olympics appearances (overview)
- 1932; 1936; 1948; 1952; 1956; 1960; 1964; 1968; 1972; 1976; 1980; 1984; 1988; 1992; 1996; 2000; 2004; 2008; 2012; 2016; 2020; 2024; 2028

Colombia will compete at the 2028 Summer Olympics in Los Angeles from 14 to 30 July 2028.

== Competitors ==
The following is the list of number of competitors in the Games.

Sport	Men	Women	Total
Football	0	18	18
Total	0	18	18

== Football ==
Summary

Key:

- A.E.T – After extra time.
- P – Match decided by penalty-shootout.

Team	Event	Group Stage				Quarterfinal	Semifinal	Final / BM	
Team	Event	Opposition Score	Opposition Score	Opposition Score	Rank	Opposition Score	Opposition Score	Opposition Score	Rank
Colombia	Women's tournament								

=== Women's tournament ===
Colombia women's football team qualified for the Olympics by advancing to the final match of the 2025 Copa América Femenina.

Team roster

Group play
