= Colombia at the 2022 Winter Olympics =

- Flag of Colombia
- IOC code: COL
- NOC: Colombian Olympic Committee
- Website: www.olimpicocol.co (in Spanish)

in Beijing, China February 4–20, 2022
- Competitors: 3 (2 men and 1 woman) in 3 sports
- Flag bearers (opening): Carlos Andres Quintana; Laura Gómez
- Flag bearer (closing): Laura Gómez
- Medals: Gold 0 Silver 0 Bronze 0 Total 0

Winter Olympics appearances (overview)
- 2010; 2014; 2018; 2022; 2026

Colombia competed at the 2022 Winter Olympics in Beijing, China, from 4 to 20 February 2022. It was the country's third appearance at the Winter Olympics, since its debut at the 2010 Winter Olympics in Vancouver. The Colombian delegation consisted of a three athletes competing in a three sports. Colombia did not win any medals at the Games.

== Background ==
The Colombian Olympic Committee (Comité Olímpico Colombiano) was formed in 1936 and recognized by the International Olympic Committee (IOC) in 1939. Colombia first competed in the Olympics at the 1932 Summer Olympics. However, it made its first Winter Olympics appearance only at the 2010 Winter Olympics in Vancouver. The 2022 Winter Olympics was the country's third appearance at the Winter Olympics.

The 2022 Winter Olympics was held in Beijing, China, from 4 to 20 February 2022. Skater Laura Gómez and skier Carlos Andres Quintana were the country's flagbearers during the opening ceremony. Gómez was also the flagbearer during the closing ceremony. Colombia did not win a medal at the Games.

== Competitors ==
The Colombian delegation consisted of three athletes competing in three sports.

Sport	Men	Women	Total
Alpine skiing	1	0	1
Cross-country skiing	1	0	1
Speed skating	0	1	1
Total	2	1	3

== Alpine skiing ==
The basic qualification mark for the slalom and giant slalom events stipulated an average of less than 160 points in the list published by the International Ski Federation (FIS) as on 17 January 2022. The quotas were allocated further based on athletes satisfying other criteria with a maximum of 22 athletes (11 male and 11 female athletes) from a single participating NOC. Subject to the other criteria, Colombia qualified one male alpine skier for the Games.

Born on 21 August 1998, Michael Poettoz was born in Cali and was adopted by a French family at a younger age. Poettoz grew up in France and learned how to ski in Les Carroz d'Araches. He became the first Colombian to compete in the Winter Youth Olympics in Lillehammer, Norway. He was competing in his second Winter Olympics, after his debut at the 2018 Winter Olympics.

The alpine skiing events were held at the Yanqing National Alpine Skiing Centre. In the men's giant slalom event, he completed his first run in 1:12.83 to be ranked 36th amongst the 87 competitors. In the second run, he improved to 30th in the classification, though he took a longer time of 1:17.19 to complete the course. He was classified in 31st place overall after the two runs. In the slalom event, he did not complete his first run and hence was not classified in the overall classification.

Athlete	Event	Run 1		Run 2		Total	
Athlete	Event	Time	Rank	Time	Rank	Time	Rank
Michael Poettoz	Men's giant slalom	1:12.83	36	1:17.19	30	2:30.02	31
Michael Poettoz	Men's slalom	DNF		Did not advance			

== Cross-country skiing ==
As per the International Ski Federation (FIS), a maximum of 296 athletes were allowed to compete in cross-country skiing, including 148 men and 148 women. A maximum of 16 athletes per National Olympic Committee was allowed to compete with a maximum of eight per gender and not more than four athletes in any single event. An athlete who has less than 150 FIS Distance points on the ranking list published on 19 January 2026, was eligible for participation in the distance and/or sprint events. If an athlete has not met the 'A' standard, but had less than 350 FIS Distance points, the athlete was allowed be entered in the freestyle distance race, and an athlete who had less than 350 FIS Sprint points was allowed to be entered in the sprint race.

By meeting the basic qualification standards, Colombia qualified one male cross-country skier, Carlos Andrés Quintana for the classical and sprint races. This was Quintana's debut at the Winter Olympics.

The cross-country skiing events were held at the Zhangjiakou Nordic Centre and Biathlon Centre in Chongli District. In the 15km classical event, Quintana finished 95th out of the 97 participants with a time of over 55 minutes and 41 seconds. In the sprint event, he finished 98th and last amongst the classified finishers out of the 100 participants with a time of over four minutes and eight seconds.

Athlete	Event	Final		
Athlete	Event	Time	Deficit	Rank
Carlos Andrés Quintana	Men's 15 km classical	55:41.9	+17:47.1	95 4:08.66 (88)

== Speed skating ==
A total quota of 166 athletes were eligible to compete at the Games. Countries were assigned quotas based on their performance during the 2021–22 ISU Speed Skating World Cup in the autumn of 2021. Each nation was permitted to enter a maximum of two athletes per gender for the mass start event. Each nation was permitted to send at most seven speed skating athletes per gender in total. Colombia qualified one female speed skater in the mass start event through the 2021–22 ISU Speed Skating World Cup.

Gómez took the sport of speed skating only in her late twenties and holds several Colombian national records in speed skating. She competed in the women's mass start event at the 2018 Winter Olympics. This was her second Olympic appearance.

The speed skating events were held at the National Speed Skating Oval at Beijing. In the women's mass start event, she finished 11th in the first semifinals out of the 14 participants. She was ranked 22nd overall out of the 28 participants and did not advance to the finals.

Athlete	Event	Semifinal			Final		
Athlete	Event	Points	Time	Rank	Points	Time	Rank
Laura Gómez	Women's mass start	0	8:31.66	11	Did not advance		22

== See also ==
- Tropical nations at the Winter Olympics
