= Colombia at the Olympics =

- IOC code: COL
- NOC: Colombian Olympic Committee
- Website: www.olimpicocol.co (in Spanish)
- Medals Ranked 71st: Gold 5 Silver 16 Bronze 17 Total 38

Summer appearances
- 1932; 1936; 1948; 1952; 1956; 1960; 1964; 1968; 1972; 1976; 1980; 1984; 1988; 1992; 1996; 2000; 2004; 2008; 2012; 2016; 2020; 2024; 2028

Winter appearances
- 2010; 2014; 2018; 2022; 2026

Colombia first participated at the Olympic Games in 1932, and has sent athletes to compete in all of the Summer Olympic Games since then, missing only the 1952 Games. The nation also participated in the Winter Olympic Games since its debut in 2010, missing only the 2014 Games. Colombian athletes have won a total of 38 Olympic medals (five gold, sixteen silver and seventeen bronze) in eight different sports, with weightlifting and cycling as the most successful ones. Colombia is the third most successful South American country at the Olympic Games, after Brazil and Argentina respectively. The Colombian Olympic Committee was created in 1936 and recognised by the International Olympic Committee in 1948.

Shooter Helmut Bellingrodt won the country's first Olympic medal, a silver at the Munich 1972 Olympics. Weightlifter María Isabel Urrutia became the first Olympic champion representing the country at the Sydney Olympics in 2000. BMX rider Mariana Pajón is the most successful Colombian Olympian, with two golds and one silver.

== History ==
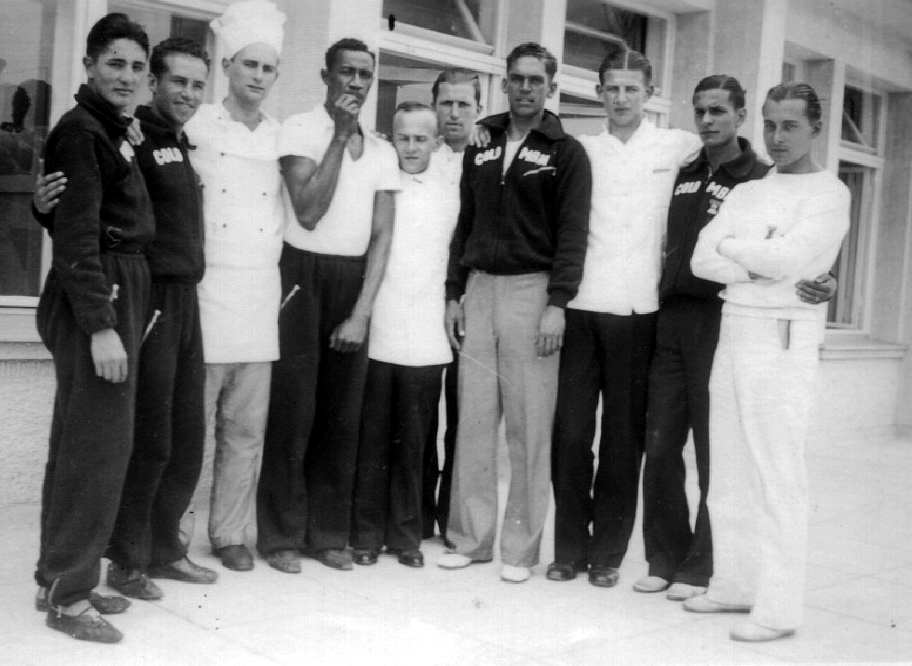
Colombian delegation at the 1936 Berlin Olympic Games

=== Early years ===
One Colombian national, Francisco Henríquez de Zubiría, competed at the 1900 Summer Olympics before the advent of rules tying all participants to National Olympic Committees. Henríquez de Zubiría was born in and lived in Paris, competed for a French club in the tug of war event, and is often listed as competing for France. The IOC currently lists this team as silver medalists under the mixed team designation.

A Colombian delegation attended the Olympic Games for the first time in the 1932 Summer Games in Los Angeles, with only one athlete: Jorge Perry. Perry sent a letter to the International Olympic Committee in January 1932 in which he introduces himself, describes Colombia as "a little South American country aiming to grow its sporting structure and willing to be part of the olympic movement", and expresses his desire to take part in the then upcoming competition. The IOC not only accepted his request, but also offered their help before and during competition. On July 30, 1932, he paraded in the opening ceremony representing a country not then affiliated to the IOC. He competed in the marathon, but after ten kilometers was unable to finish; the race was won by Argentina's Juan Carlos Zabala. Fourteen years later in 1946, Colombia's first olympian died in Bogotá, four days after suffering a motorcycle accident near his native Samacá.

For the 1936 edition of the Games, the new Comité Olímpico Colombiano sent five athletes to compete in Berlin. After the controversial decision to replay a football match between Peru and Austria (after an adverse result for the Austrians), the Colombian delegation left the olympic village as a sign of support to the Peruvian team.

At the 1948 London Olympics, the Colombian contingent for the first time included athletes from sports other than track and field, taking part in fencing and swimming.

Due to financing problems and an ongoing violent period, Colombia did not take part in the 1952 Helsinki Olympics.

For the Melbourne Games in 1956, the Colombian team expanded to 26 athletes, sending cyclists and weightlifters for the first time.

Since then, Colombia has not missed any Summer Games, and sent its first women's contingent to the 1968 Summer Olympics in Mexico City.

=== First medals ===
Colombia won their first olympic medals at the Munich Olympics in 1972, forty years after their Olympic debut. The first one was a silver medal won by shooter Helmut Bellingrodt in the 50 metre running target event. In addition, Clemente Rojas and Alfonso Pérez both won bronze in boxing at those games, bringing the medal tally for the Colombian delegation to a total of three.

Colombia did not join the US-Led boycott of the 1980 Moscow Olympics, although then President Julio Turbay initially supported the boycott. Comité Olímpico Colombiano president Fidel Mendoza did not abide the Turbay's recommendation and gave the green light to 23 Colombian athletes to participate. They won no medals in Russia.

Competing in the 1984 Olympics in Los Angeles, shooter Helmut Bellingrodt won his second silver medal in the same event, making him the first Colombian athlete to won two Olympics medals; his medal was the only one the Colombian contingent won at those Games.

At the 1988 Olympics in Seoul, another Colombian boxer won a bronze medal: Jorge Eliécer Julio made it to the Bantamweight category semifinals and faced Bulgaria's Aleksandar Khristov; the Colombian was seen as dominating his opponent, but in the end three out of five judges declared the Bulgarian as winner of the bout, prompting protests from fans in the audience.

Ximena Restrepo became the first Colombian woman to win an Olympic medal, winning bronze in the women's 400 m. at the 1992 Barcelona Olympics. Her 49.64 seconds mark still stands as the South American record for that event.

The country failed to win a medal at the 1996 Centennial Olympics in Atlanta, although marathon runner Carlos Grisales ranked eleventh in the men's event, the highest position a Colombian athlete has ever achieved in an olympic marathon race so far.

=== 21st century ===
In the Sydney 2000 Games, Weightlifter María Isabel Urrutia won the nation's first olympic gold medal at the 75 kg. category. Urrutia lifted the same weight than silver and bronze medal winners Nigeria's Ruth Ogbeifo and Taiwan's Kuo Yi-hang respectively, but won gold due her body weight being less than that of her rivals. Señal Colombia broadcast her victory and when the event ended, the narrators mistakenly believed she won bronze as they saw on screen the results of the clean and jerk phase. Seconds after, the final results were screened and they realized their error and Urrutia's accomplishment.

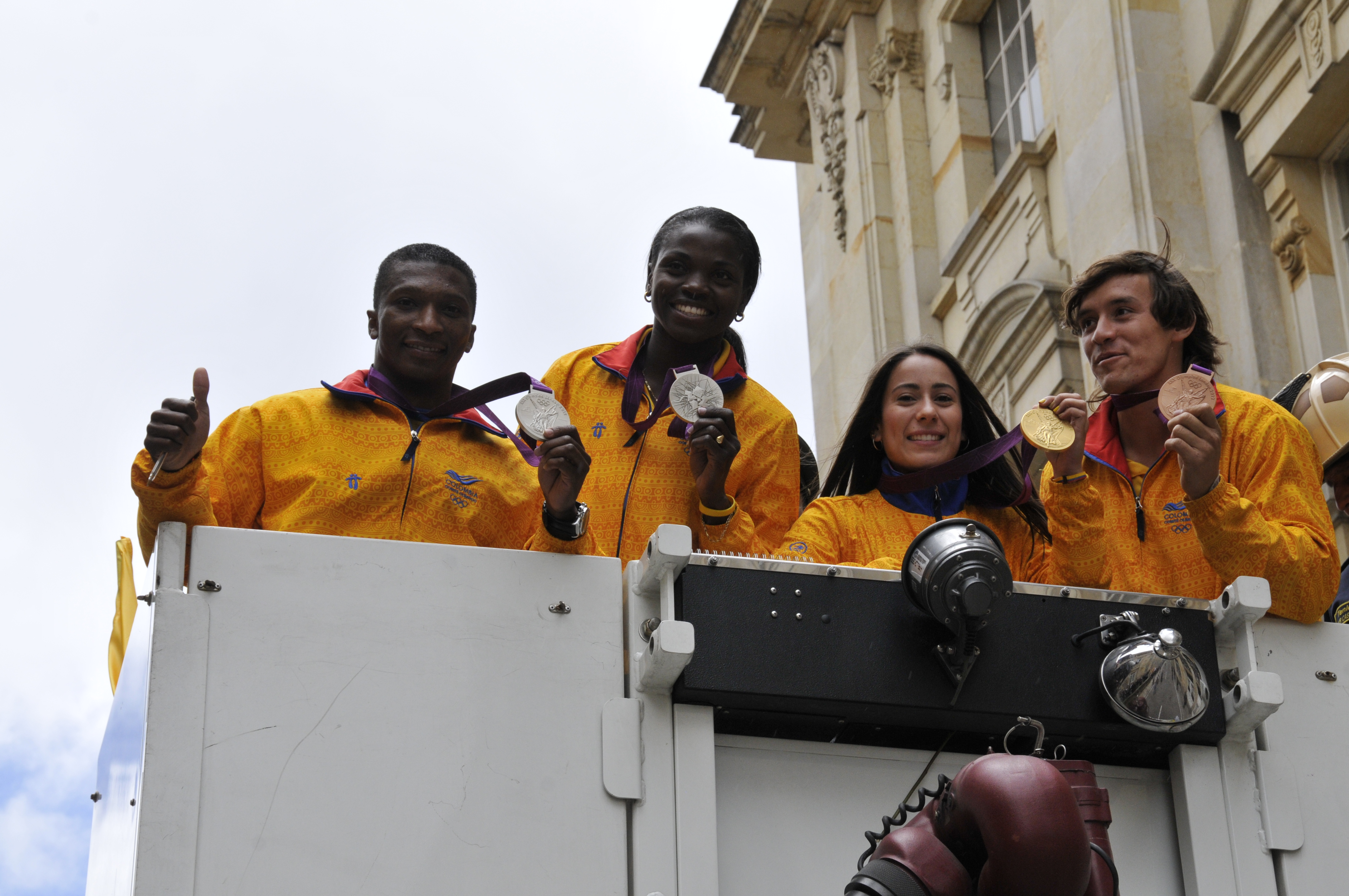
From left to right: Óscar Figueroa, Caterine Ibargüen, Mariana Pajón and Carlos Oquendo

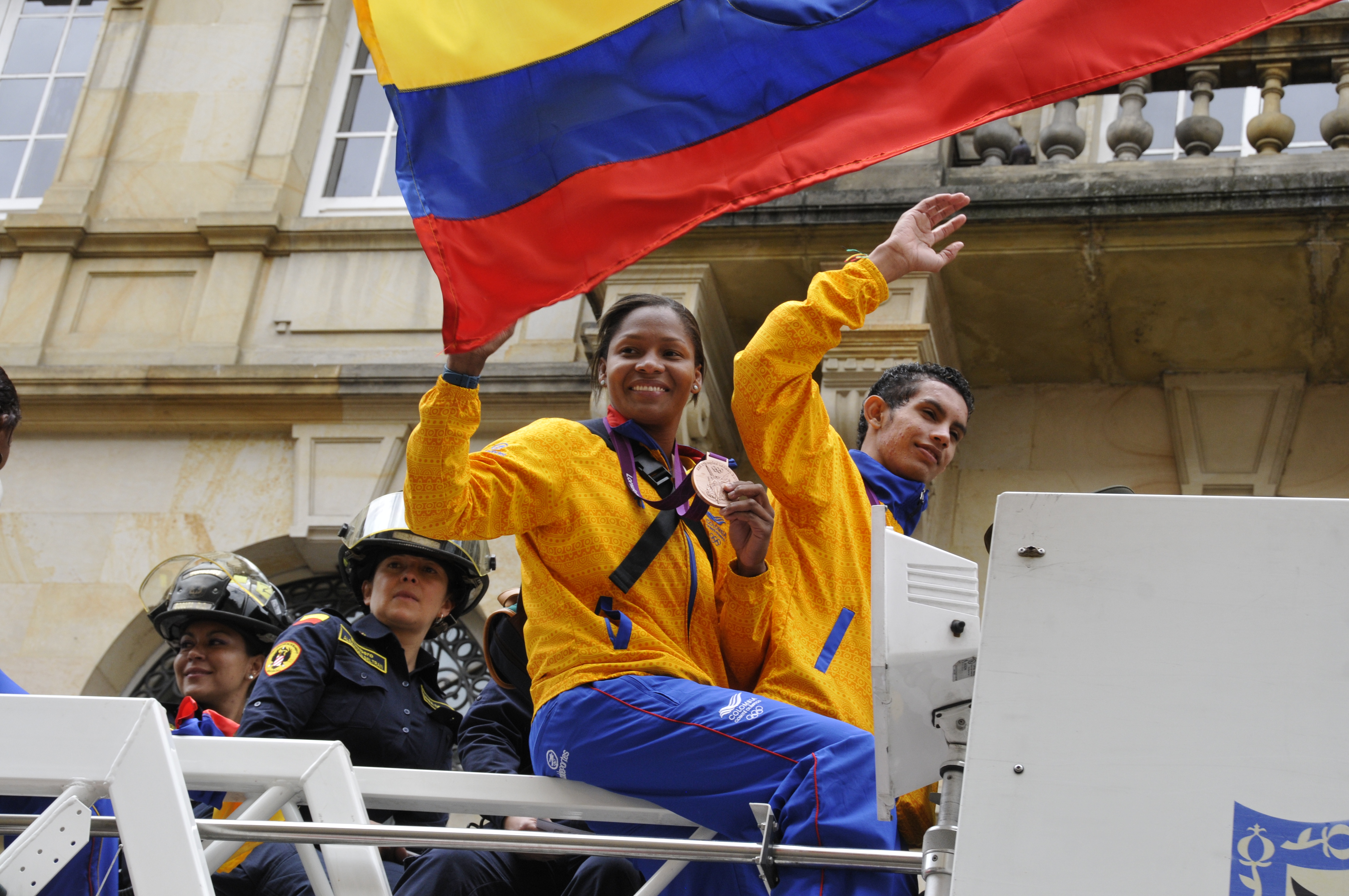
Yuri Alvear and Óscar Muñoz

Colombian Olympic medalists of 2012, being greeted in Bogotá

When the Olympic Games returned to Greece in Athens 2004, the Colombian delegation collected two bronze medals through weightlifter Mabel Mosquera and cyclist María Luisa Calle, who won Colombia's first olympic medal in Cycling. Calle was originally stripped of her medal after failing an antidoping test for heptaminol. She assured that hours before the race, she took an anti-migraine pill which contained isometheptene, a substance which transforms into heptaminol during laboratory analyses. The bronze medal she won in the women's points race was later returned, being one of a few cases in which IOC returned a medal stripped for doping.

For the Beijing Olympics in 2008, the Colombian roster won two medals: weightlifter Diego Salazar won silver in the men's 62kg, and Jackeline Rentería won Colombia's first olympic medal in Wrestling, earning bronze in women's freestyle 55kg category. During a wave of retests in 2016, it was disclosed that original gold and bronze medalists in the women's weightlifting 69kg event failed an antidoping test; weightlifter Leydi Solís finished fourth in that event back in 2008. Later in January 2017 the disgraced aforementioned medalists were officially disqualified, meaning that Solís was upgraded to second place. She received her silver medal in December 2017.

Colombia made its Winter Olympics debut in 2010 in Vancouver. US-born Swiss Skier Cynthia Denzler represented the country in the women's slalom and giant slalom. She ranked 51st in the slalom event.

For the 2012 Olympics, Colombia sent a delegation composed of 104 athletes, the first time the delegation exceeded one hundred participants. Their performance improved remarkably as well. The maximum number of medals Colombia had won in one edition of the games was three, at both Munich 1972 and Beijing 2008. In London the Colombian contingent won eight medals in six different sports. BMX rider Mariana Pajón won Colombia's first golden medal since Sydney 2000. Cyclist Rigoberto Urán won silver in the men's road race, the first olympic medal in road cycling competitions for the country. Track and field athlete Caterine Ibargüen won silver in the women's triple jump, the first medal in Athletics since Barcelona 1992. Weightlifter Óscar Figueroa won also silver in the men's 62kg, setting an olympic record of 177 kg in the clean and jerk phase. Jackeline Rentería matched her performance in Beijing and won again a bronze medal, joining Helmut Bellingrodt as the only Colombian athletes to win two olympic medals. Carlos Oquendo also won bronze in the cycling men's bmx race, on the same day Pajón won gold in the women's race. The bronze medals won by Yuri Alvear in Judo and Óscar Muñoz in Taekwondo, were the first olympic medals for Colombia in those sports.

The strong performances achieved in London 2012 continued and improved in Rio de Janeiro 2016. Competing at the first Olympics held in South America, Colombian athletes won three gold, two silver and three bronze medals, winning again a total of eight medals. Triple jump World champion Caterine Ibargüen won a gold medal in the women's event, the first olympic golden medal in Athletics for Colombia. Óscar Figueroa upgraded his silver medal to gold in the men's weightlifting 62kg category, keeping Colombia's good streak in Olympic Weightlifting since 2000 and becoming the first male Olympic champion for the country. Mariana Pajón became the first Colombian athlete to be Olympic gold medalist twice, as she won again the women's cycling bmx race. Judoka Yuri Alvear won silver in the women's 70kg event, improving her 2012 bronze medal. Ibargüen, Figueroa, Pajón and Alvear joined shooter Bellingrodt and wrestler Rentería as the only Colombian athletes to have won two Olympic Medals. Boxers Yuberjen Martínez and Ingrit Valencia won Colombia's first olympic medals in Boxing since Seoul 1988; Martínez won silver and Valencia earned bronze, making her the first Colombian female boxer to win an olympic medal. BMX rider Carlos Ramírez won bronze in the men's race. Weightlifter Luis Javier Mosquera originally finished fourth in the men's 69kg event, but was later awarded the bronze medal as original winner Kyrgyzstan's Izzat Artykov was disqualified after testing positive for the stimulant strychnine. After an absence of eight years, Colombia competed again at the Winter Olympics in 2018 in PyeongChang.

The Colombian delegation was made up of athletes competing in alpine skiing, cross-country skiing and ice speed skating, becoming in the first Latin American country to compete in the latter.

At the rescheduled Tokyo 2020 Olympics, Colombia won four silver and one bronze medals. Mariana Pajón added silver to her two previous golden medals earned in BMX racing, achievement that made her the first Colombian sportsperson to win three olympic medals. Sandra Arenas became in the first race walker from the country to win an Olympic medal, as she ranked second in the women's 20 km. event.

In 2024 Paris Olympics, gymnast Angel Barajas became the first Colombian gymnast to win an Olympic medal, earning a silver on the horizontal bar.

== Medal tables ==
=== Medals by Summer Games ===
Games	Athletes	Gold	Silver	Bronze	Total	Rank
(United States) 1932 Los Angeles	1	0	0	0	0	–
(Nazi Germany) 1936 Berlin	5	0	0	0	0	–
(United Kingdom) 1948 London	5	0	0	0	0	–
(Finland) 1952 Helsinki	did not participate					
(Australia) 1956 Melbourne	26	0	0	0	0	–
(Italy) 1960 Rome	16	0	0	0	0	–
(Japan) 1964 Tokyo	20	0	0	0	0	–
1968 Mexico City	44	0	0	0	0	–
(West Germany) 1972 Munich	59	0	1	2	3	31
(Canada) 1976 Montreal	35	0	0	0	0	–
(Soviet Union) 1980 Moscow	23	0	0	0	0	–
(United States) 1984 Los Angeles	39	0	1	0	1	33
(South Korea) 1988 Seoul	40	0	0	1	1	46
(Spain) 1992 Barcelona	49	0	0	1	1	54
(United States) 1996 Atlanta	48	0	0	0	0	–
(Australia) 2000 Sydney	44	1	0	0	1	50
(Greece) 2004 Athens	53	0	0	2	2	68
(China) 2008 Beijing	67	0	2	1	3	60
(United Kingdom) 2012 London	104	1	3	5	9	38
(Brazil) 2016 Rio de Janeiro	147	3	2	3	8	22
(Japan) 2020 Tokyo	70	0	4	1	5	66
(France) 2024 Paris	87	0	3	1	4	66
(United States) 2028 Los Angeles	future event					
(Australia) 2032 Brisbane	future event					
Total		5	16	17	38	71

=== Medals by Winter Games ===
Games	Athletes	Gold	Silver	Bronze	Total	Rank
(Canada) 2010 Vancouver	1	0	0	0	0	–
(Russia) 2014 Sochi	did not participate					
(South Korea) 2018 Pyeongchang	4	0	0	0	0	–
(China) 2022 Beijing	3	0	0	0	0	–
(Italy) 2026 Milano Cortina	1	0	0	0	0	–
(France) 2030 French Alps	future event					
(United States) 2034 Utah	future event					
Total		0	0	0	0	–

=== Medals by summer sport ===
Sports	Gold	Silver	Bronze	Total	Rank
Weightlifting	2	6	3	11	24
Cycling	2	2	4	8	20
Athletics	1	3	1	5	58
Shooting	0	2	0	2	55
Boxing	0	1	4	5	55
Judo	0	1	1	2	42
Gymnastics	0	1	0	1	45
Wrestling	0	0	3	3	62
Taekwondo	0	0	1	1	39
Total	5	16	17	38	71

=== Medals by gender ===
Gender	Gold	Silver	Bronze	Total
Men	1	10	8	19
Women	4	6	9	19
Mixed	0	0	0	0
Total	5	16	17	38

== List of medalists ==
Medal	Name	Games	Sport	Event
Silver	Helmut Bellingrodt	(West Germany) 1972 Munich	Shooting	50 metre running target
Bronze	Clemente Rojas	(West Germany) 1972 Munich	Boxing	Men's featherweight
Bronze	Alfonso Pérez	(West Germany) 1972 Munich	Boxing	Men's lightweight
Silver	Helmut Bellingrodt	(United States) 1984 Los Angeles	Shooting	50 metre running target
Bronze	Jorge Eliécer Julio	(South Korea) 1988 Seoul	Boxing	Men's bantamweight
Bronze	Ximena Restrepo	(Spain) 1992 Barcelona	Athletics	Women's 400 metres
Gold	María Isabel Urrutia	(Australia) 2000 Sydney	Weightlifting	Women's 75 kg
Bronze	María Luisa Calle	(Greece) 2004 Athens	Cycling	Women's points race
Bronze	Mabel Mosquera	(Greece) 2004 Athens	Weightlifting	Women's 53 kg
Silver	Diego Salazar	(China) 2008 Beijing	Weightlifting	Men's 62 kg
Silver	Leydi Solís	(China) 2008 Beijing	Weightlifting	Women's 69 kg
Bronze	Jackeline Rentería	(China) 2008 Beijing	Wrestling	Women's freestyle 55 kg
Gold	Mariana Pajón	(United Kingdom) 2012 London	Cycling	Women's BMX
Silver	Caterine Ibargüen	(United Kingdom) 2012 London	Athletics	Women's triple jump
Silver	Rigoberto Urán	(United Kingdom) 2012 London	Cycling	Men's road race
Silver	Óscar Figueroa	(United Kingdom) 2012 London	Weightlifting	Men's 62 kg
Bronze	Carlos Oquendo	(United Kingdom) 2012 London	Cycling	Men's BMX
Bronze	Yuri Alvear	(United Kingdom) 2012 London	Judo	Women's 70 kg
Bronze	Óscar Muñoz	(United Kingdom) 2012 London	Taekwondo	Men's 58 kg
Bronze	Ubaldina Valoyes	(United Kingdom) 2012 London	Weightlifting	Women's 69 kg
Bronze	Jackeline Rentería	(United Kingdom) 2012 London	Wrestling	Women's freestyle 55 kg
Gold	Caterine Ibargüen	(Brazil) 2016 Rio de Janeiro	Athletics	Women's triple jump
Gold	Mariana Pajón	(Brazil) 2016 Rio de Janeiro	Cycling	Women's BMX
Gold	Óscar Figueroa	(Brazil) 2016 Rio de Janeiro	Weightlifting	Men's 62 kg
Silver	Yuberjen Martínez	(Brazil) 2016 Rio de Janeiro	Boxing	Men's light flyweight
Silver	Yuri Alvear	(Brazil) 2016 Rio de Janeiro	Judo	Women's 70 kg
Bronze	Ingrit Valencia	(Brazil) 2016 Rio de Janeiro	Boxing	Women's flyweight
Bronze	Carlos Ramírez	(Brazil) 2016 Rio de Janeiro	Cycling	Men's BMX
Bronze	Luis Javier Mosquera	(Brazil) 2016 Rio de Janeiro	Weightlifting	Men's 69 kg
Silver	Luis Javier Mosquera	(Japan) 2020 Tokyo	Weightlifting	Men's 67 kg
Silver	Mariana Pajón	(Japan) 2020 Tokyo	Cycling	Women's BMX
Silver	Anthony Zambrano	(Japan) 2020 Tokyo	Athletics	Men's 400 metres
Silver	Sandra Arenas	(Japan) 2020 Tokyo	Athletics	Women's 20 kilometres walk
Bronze	Carlos Ramírez	(Japan) 2020 Tokyo	Cycling	Men's BMX
Silver	Ángel Barajas	(France) 2024 Paris	Gymnastics	Men's horizontal bar
Silver	Yeison López	(France) 2024 Paris	Weightlifting	Men's 89 kg
Silver	Mari Sánchez	(France) 2024 Paris	Weightlifting	Women's 71 kg
Bronze	Tatiana Rentería	(France) 2024 Paris	Wrestling	Women's freestyle 76 kg

=== Multiple medalists ===
Athlete	Sport	Games	Gold	Silver	Bronze	Total
Mariana Pajón	Cycling	2012, 2016, 2020	2	1	0	3
Caterine Ibargüen	Athletics	2012, 2016	1	1	0	2
Óscar Figueroa	Weightlifting	2012, 2016	1	1	0	2
Helmut Bellingrodt	Shooting	1972, 1984	0	2	0	2
Yuri Alvear	Judo	2012, 2016	0	1	1	2
Luis Javier Mosquera	Weightlifting	2016, 2020	0	1	1	2
Jackeline Rentería	Wrestling	2008, 2012	0	0	2	2
Carlos Ramírez	Cycling	2016, 2020	0	0	2	2

== See also ==
- Category:Olympic competitors for Colombia
- Tropical nations at the Winter Olympics
- Colombia at the Paralympics
- Colombia at the Youth Olympics
- List of flag bearers for Colombia at the Olympics
