= Colombia at the 2010 Winter Olympics =

- IOC code: COL
- NOC: Colombian Olympic Committee
- Website: www.olimpicocol.co (in Spanish)

in Vancouver
- Competitors: 1 in 1 sport
- Flag bearer: Cynthia Denzler
- Medals: Gold 0 Silver 0 Bronze 0 Total 0

Winter Olympics appearances (overview)
- 2010; 2014; 2018; 2022; 2026

Colombia competed in the Winter Olympic Games for the first time at the 2010 Winter Olympics in Vancouver, Canada.

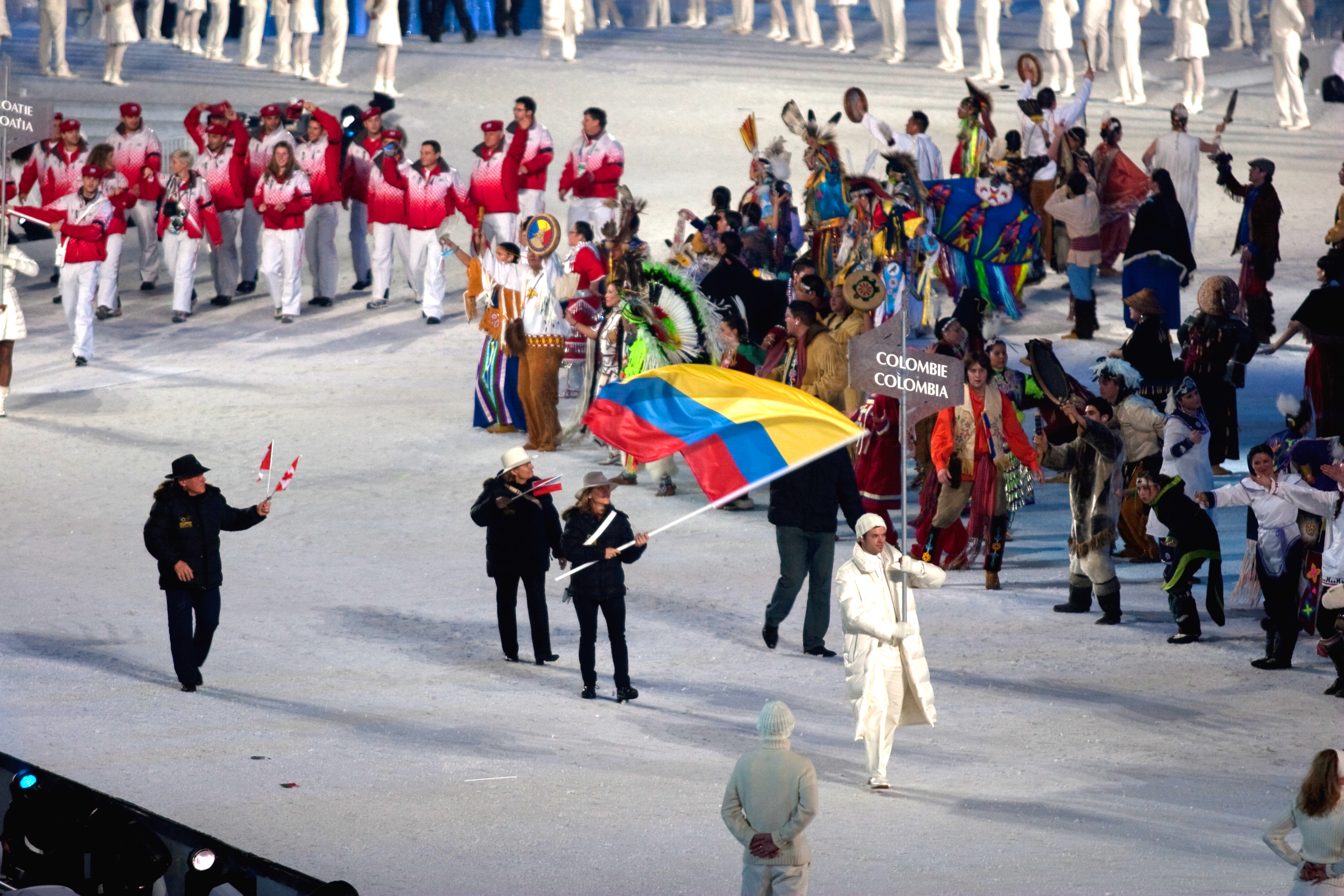
The Colombian delegation entering BC Place Stadium during the 2010 Winter Olympics opening ceremony.

== Background ==
Colombia first participated in the Summer Olympics in 1932, with one athlete, Jorge Perry, when the Colombian Olympic Committee did not exist. The committee was formed in 1936. Between 1932 and 2010, Colombia competed in five Summer Olympics, winning eleven medals. In the late 1990s, President of Federation of Skating Carlos Orlando Ferreira proposed training for speed skating athletes, but this proposition was unsuccessful after a lack of funding. Colombia first participated in the Winter Olympics in 2010.

== Preparations and arrival ==
The efforts of Hanspeter Denzler and Colombian Olympic Committee president and IOC member Andrés Botero led to the establishment of a Colombian ski team in 2007. In 2010, Colombia's delegation consisted of skier Cynthia Denzler, her father Hanspeter, and his brother Fabian, both of which served as coaches. The delegation flew to Vancouver on 10 February and stayed in the Olympic Village. Cynthia Denzler said, "it is an honour to compete for Colombia and I am happy to do so. Representing the country during the Winter Olympics is a good thing and a dream come true."

== Ceremonies ==
Colombia was one of five nations from South America participating in these Winter Olympics. The opening ceremony was dedicated to Georgian luger Nodar Kumaritashvili, who died on the day of the opening ceremony in a fatal crash. Greece opened the parade of nations, followed by Canada. Colombia was the nineteenth of 82 delegations to enter the BC Place stadium, after China and before Croatia. Denzler was the flag bearer. At the closing ceremony, which took place at BC Place, the flag bearers formed a circle around the Olympic flame. The flagbearer again was Denzler.

== Alpine skiing ==
Colombia assigned its sole delegate, Cynthia Denzler, to alpine skiing. Despite being born in California, she was allowed to compete for Colombia after her father became a citizen of the country.

Athlete	Event	Final			
Athlete	Event	Run 1	Run 2	Total	Rank
Cynthia Denzler	Giant slalom	DNF	—		DNF
Cynthia Denzler	Slalom	1:01.14	1:01.25	2:02.39	51
