= Almeidas Province =

Almeidas Province Provincia de Almeidas
- Province
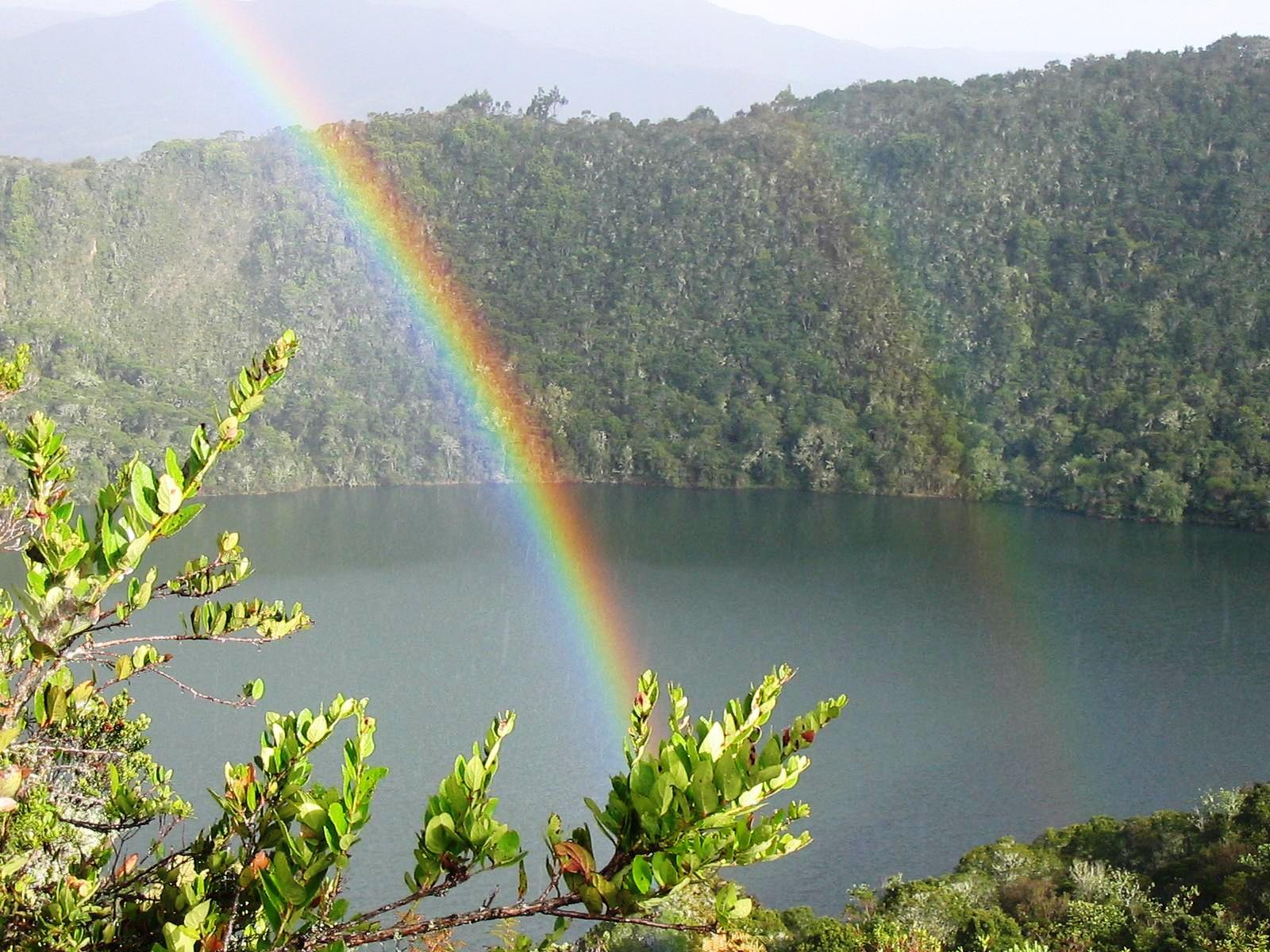
- Lake Guatavita & Cuchavira
- Etymology: Vicente & Ambrosio Almeyda
- Location of Almeidas Province in Colombia
- Coordinates: 5°08′48″N 73°40′57″W
- Country: Colombia
- Department: Cundinamarca
- Capital: Chocontá
- Municipalities: 7

Area
  - Total: 1,259.65 km^{2} (486.35 sq mi)

Population (2015)
  - Total: 89,938
  - Density: 71.399/km^{2} (184.92/sq mi)
- Time zone: UTC−05:00 (COT)
- Indigenous groups: Muisca

Almeidas Province (Spanish: Provincia de Almeidas, Spanish pronunciation: [alˈmejðas]) is one of the 15 provinces in the Cundinamarca Department, Colombia. Almeidas borders to the east with the Boyacá Department to the north with the Ubaté Province, to the west with the Central Savanna Province and to the south with the Guavio Province.

== Subdivision ==
Almeidas is subdivided into 7 municipalities:

Municipality bold is capital	Area km^{2}	Elevation (m) urban centre	Population 2015	Founded	Map
Chocontá	301.1	2655	25,257	1563	
Machetá	229.35	2094	6316	1593	
Manta	105	1924	4719	1773	
Sesquilé	141	2595	13,636	1600	
Suesca	177	2584	17,318	1537	
Tibiritá	57.2	1980	2950	1593	
Villapinzón	249	2715	19,742	1776	
Total	1259.65		89,938		
