= Ventaquemada =

Ventaquemada Padua, La Venta
- Municipality and town
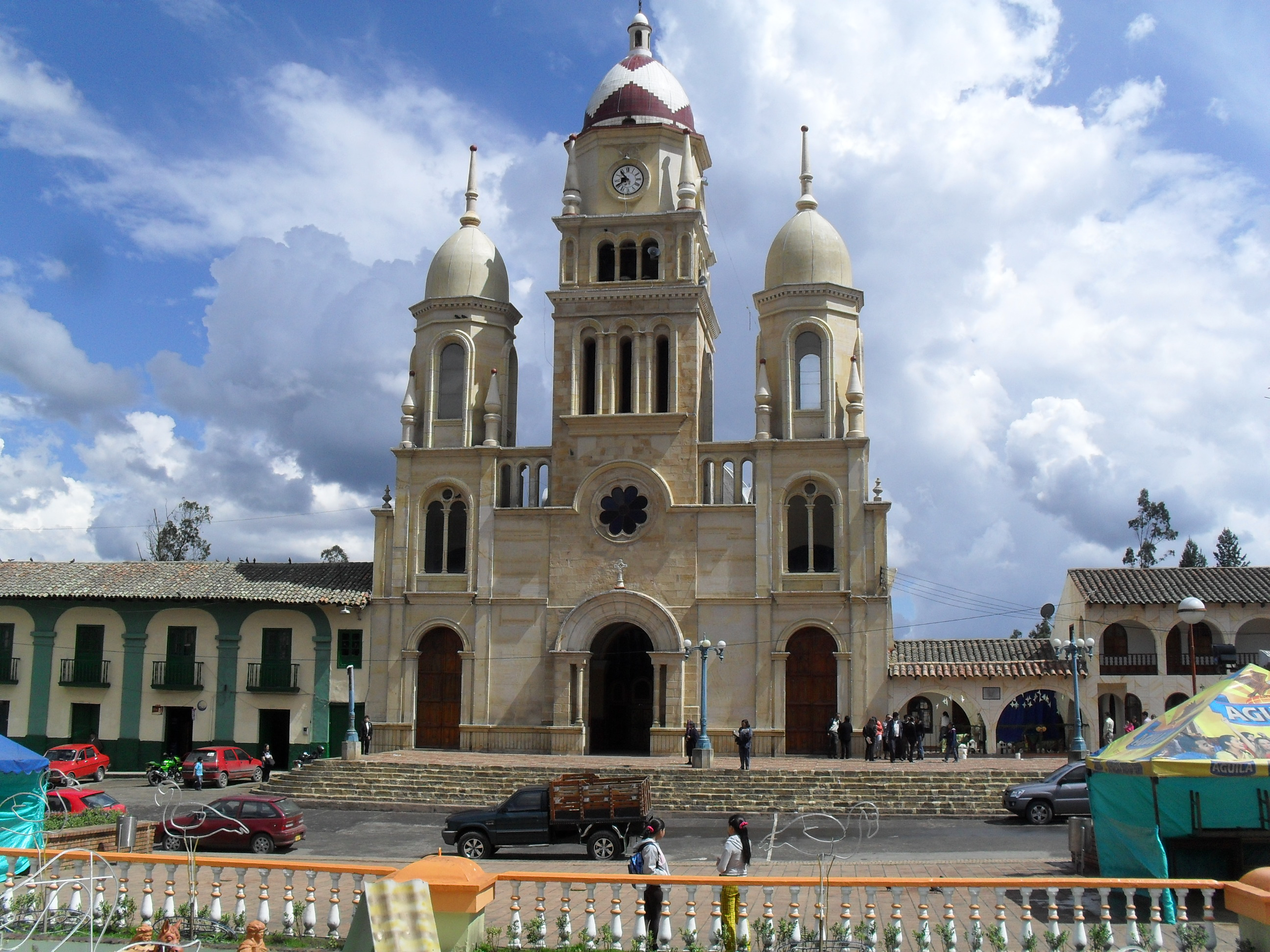
- Church of Ventaquemada

- Flag Coat of arms

- Location of the municipality and town of Ventaquemada in the Boyacá Department of Colombia
- Coordinates: 5°25′N 73°30′W
- Country: Colombia
- Department: Boyacá
- Province: Central Boyacá Province
- Founded: 17 December 1777
- Founder: Manuel Antonio Flores

Government
  - Mayor: Nelson Bohórquez Otálora (2020-2023)

Area
  - Municipality and town: 159.329 km^{2} (61.517 sq mi)
  - Urban: 0.52 km^{2} (0.20 sq mi)
- Elevation: 2,630 m (8,630 ft)

Population (2015)
  - Municipality and town: 15,442
  - Density: 96.919/km^{2} (251.02/sq mi)
  - Urban: 2,399
- Time zone: UTC-5 (Colombia Standard Time)
- Website: Official website

Ventaquemada is a town and municipality in the Central Boyacá Province, part of the Colombian department of Boyacá. Ventaquemada is located at a distance of 98 kilometres (61 mi) from the capital Bogotá and 29 kilometres (18 mi) from the departmental capital Tunja. The urban centre is situated at an altitude of 2,630 metres (8,630 ft) on the Altiplano Cundiboyacense in the Eastern Ranges of the Colombian Andes. Ventaquemada borders Tunja and Samacá in the north, Boyacá, Boyacá, Jenesano and Nuevo Colón in the east, Turmequé and Villapinzón in the south and Guachetá, Lenguazaque and Villapinzón in the west.

== Etymology ==
Former names of Ventaquemada are Padua and La Venta, indicating the commercial centre at a strategical location along the road between Bogotá and Tunja, historically the most important cities of the Altiplano. After the burning of the properties of Albarracín, the name Ventaquemada ("burnt sale") was given to the town.

== History ==
The area of Ventaquemada before the Spanish conquest was populated by the Muisca, who were organised in their loose Muisca Confederation. Ventaquemada was part of the rule of the zaque of Hunza.

Modern Ventaquemada was founded on December 17, 1777, by viceroy Manuel Antonio Flórez.

Ventaquemada is close to the Puente de Boyacá, the bridge where the decisive Battle of Boyacá in the struggle for independence of Colombia was fought. Ventaquemada has a classical colonial house and a statue honouring independence hero Simón Bolívar. The train station of Ventaquemada has long been abandoned.

== Economy ==
Main economical activity of Ventaquemada is agriculture; potatoes and maize are the major products cultivated.

== Born in Ventaquemada ==
- Héctor Moreno, former Colombian racewalker

== Gallery ==
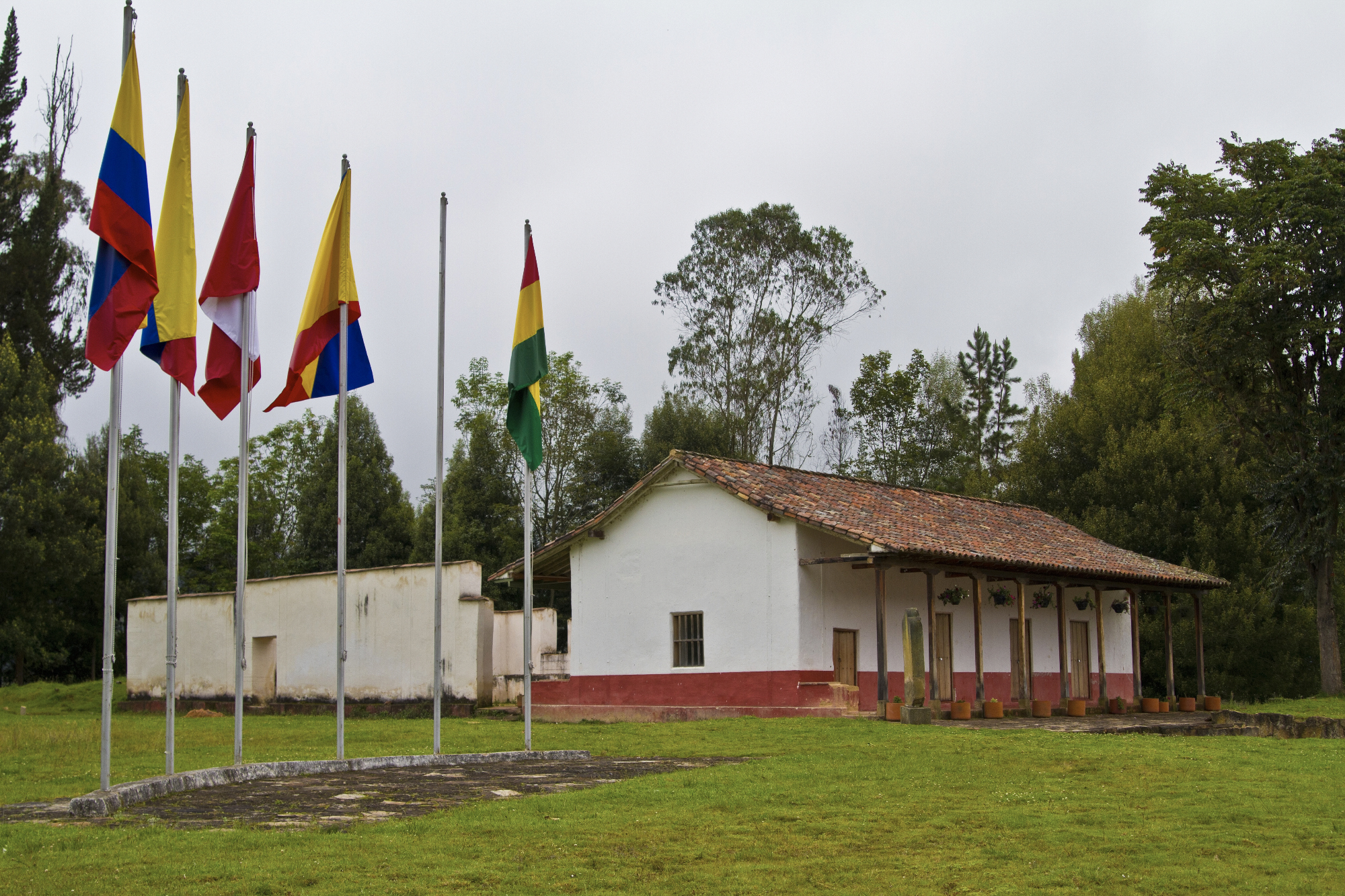
Historical house

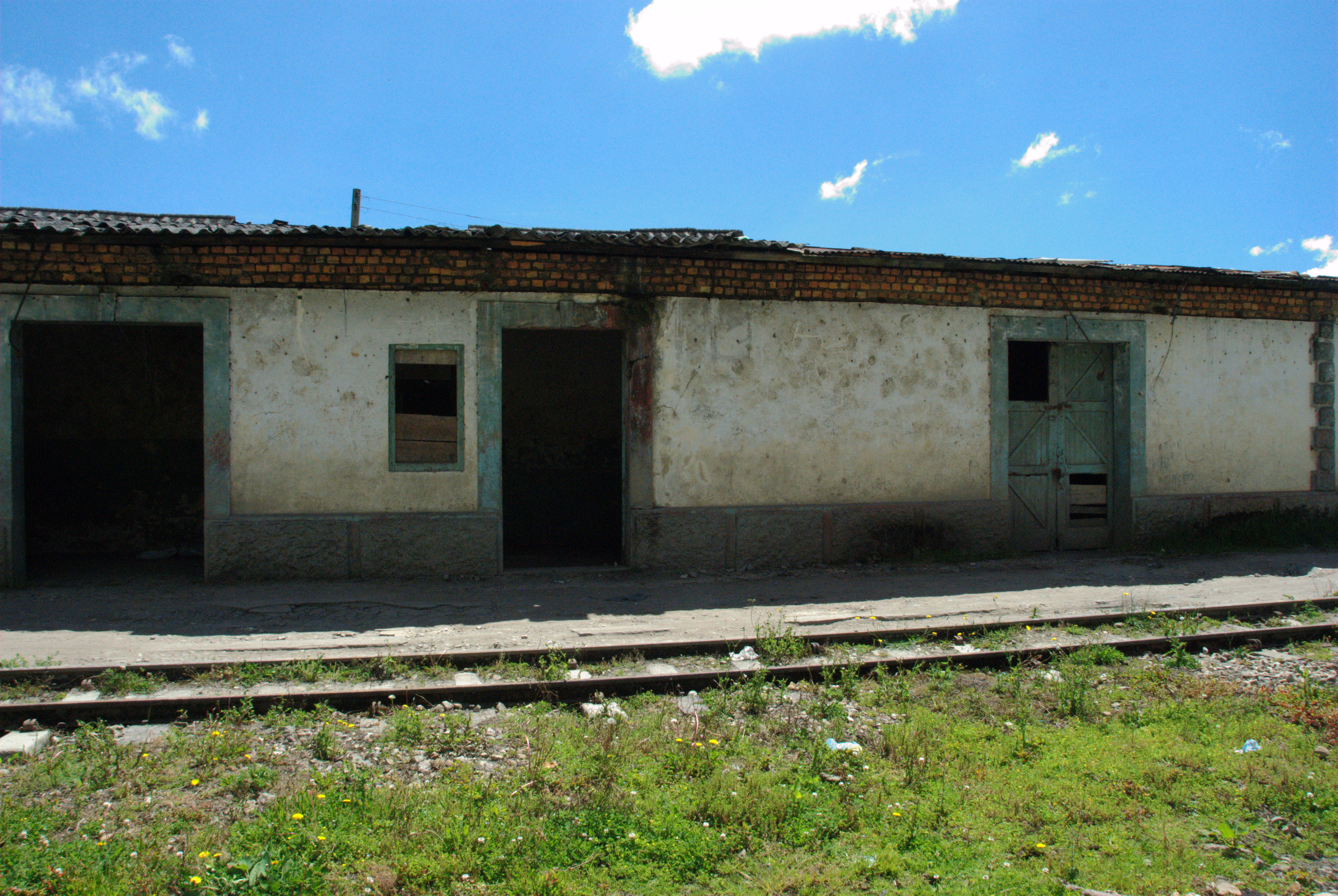
Abandoned train station

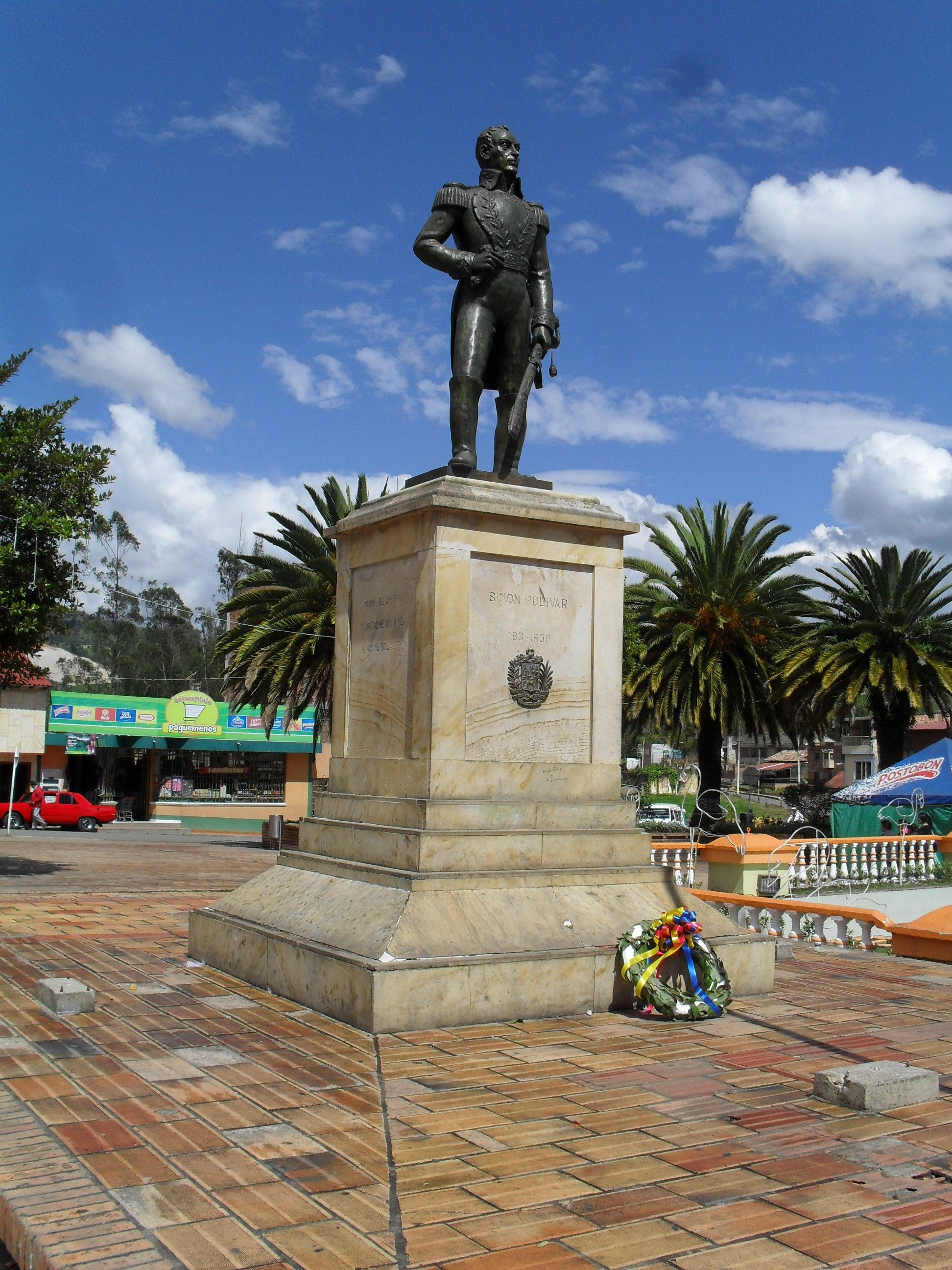
Statue of Simón Bolívar

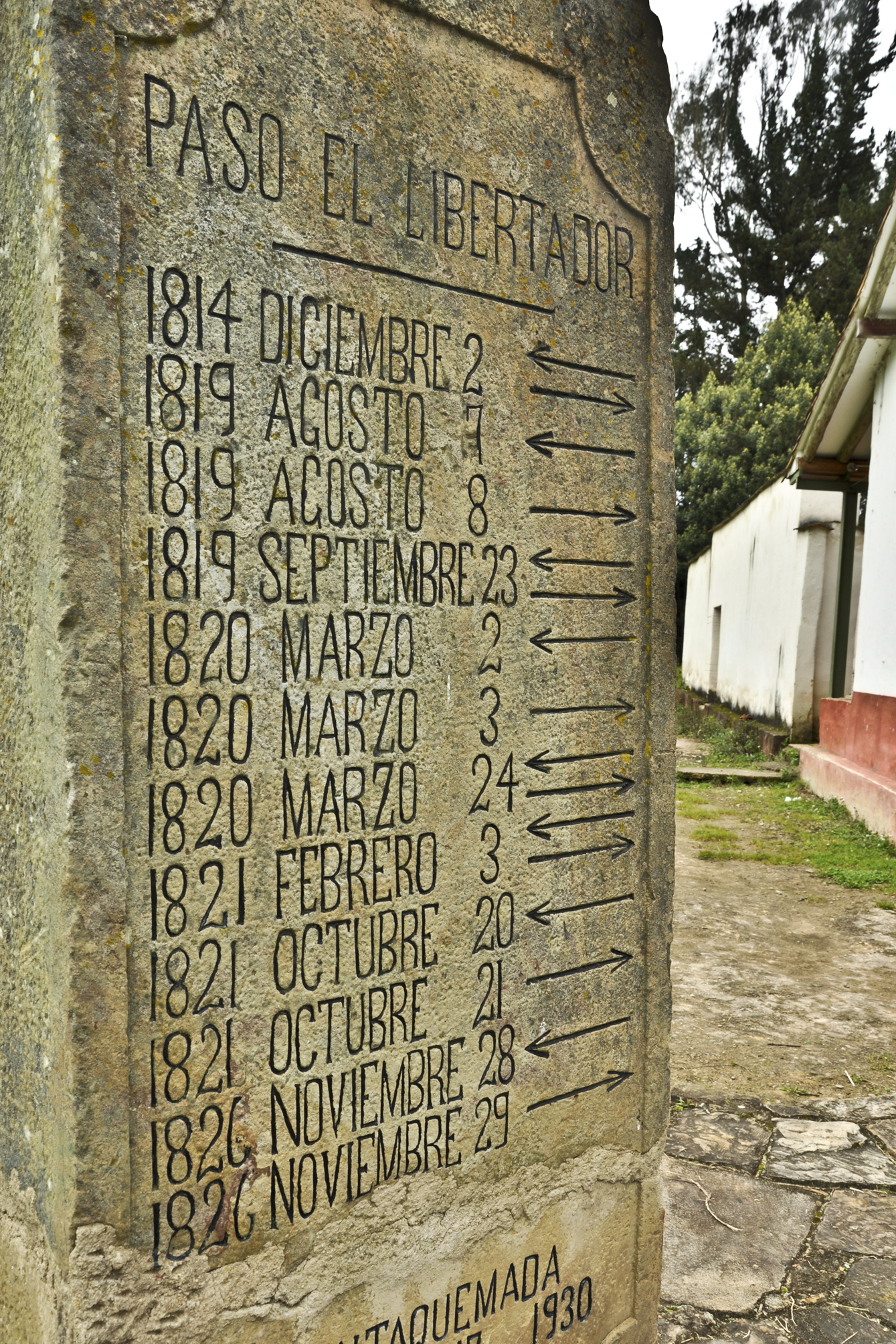
Dates when Bolívar passed through Ventaquemada

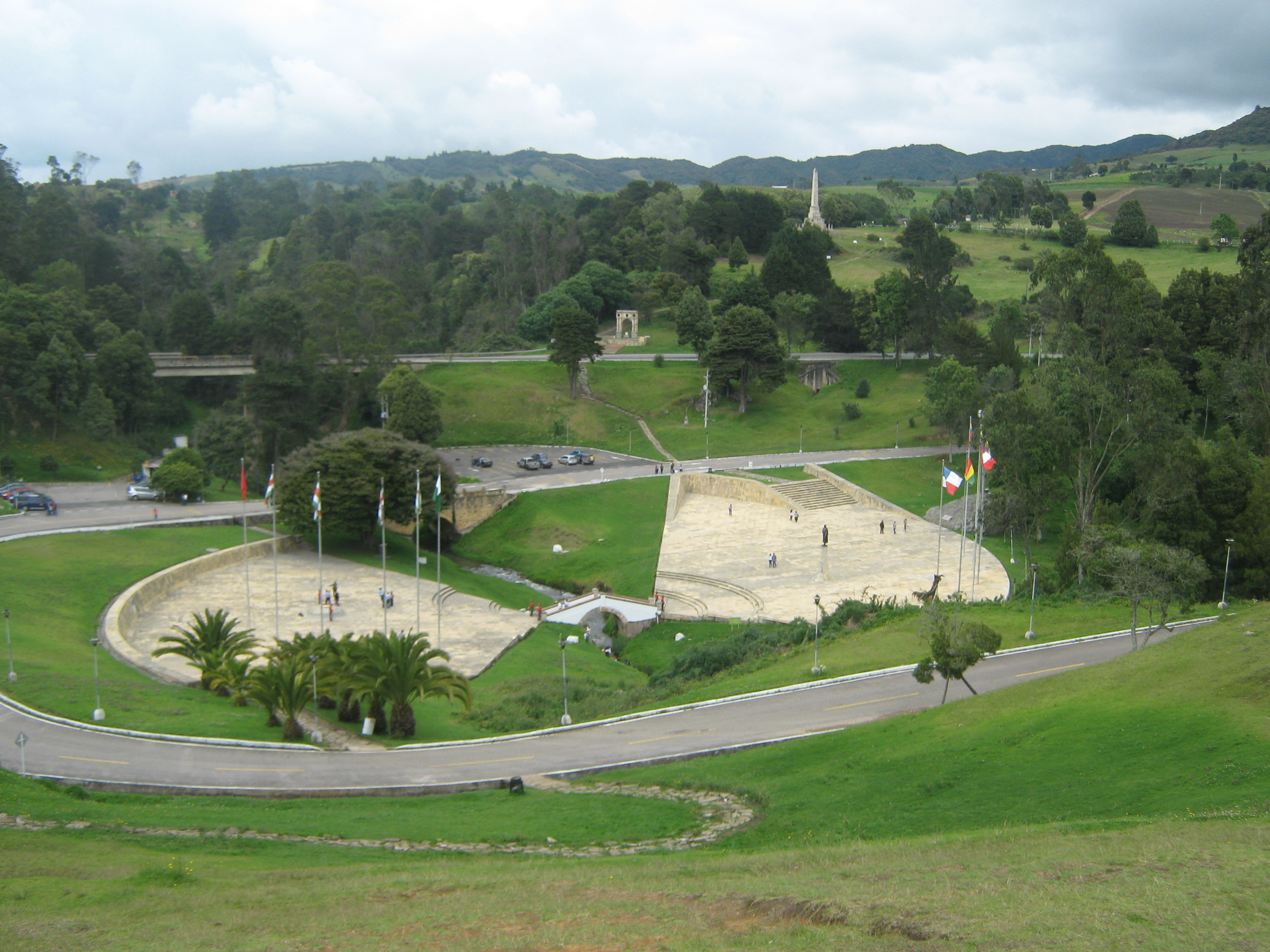
Puente de Boyacá
