= Laura Gómez (speed skater) =

Colombian roller skater and speed skater

Personal information
- Full name: Laura Isabel Gómez Quintero
- Nationality: Colombian
- Born: 17 July 1990 (age 36) Carmen de Viboral, Colombia
- Height: 167 cm (5 ft 6 in)
- Weight: 59 kg (130 lb)

Sport
- Country: Colombia
- Sport: Speed skating

Laura Isabel Gómez Quintero (Note: In this Spanish name, the first or paternal surname is Gómez and the second or maternal family name is Quintero.) (born 17 July 1990), also simply known as Laura Gómez, is a Colombian female speed skater who was a professional roller skater during her early career. She took the sport of speed skating only in late July 2017 and broke several Colombian national records for women within six months after engaging in speed skating before impressing the selectors to name herself at the 2018 Winter Olympics. She competed in the women's 3000m mass start event.

Laura Gómez was informed about her selection to the Colombian squad for the 2018 Winter Olympics, just a week prior to the start of the Winter Olympics. It was only the second appearance for Colombia at the Winter Olympics which sent a delegation of 4 participants in the multi-sport event and she was also the only Colombian woman competitor to compete during the 2018 Winter Olympics. During the 2018 Winter Olympics, she broke a national Olympic record for 1000m speed skating event for women during a test competition.

In December 2021, Gómez qualified for her second Winter Olympics in 2022.

== National records ==
She holds 5 national records in speed skating. (500m, 1000m, 1500m, 3000m, and 5000m)

Event	Record	Date	Meet	Place	Ref
500 meters	41.73	2 March 2018	AmCup Final	Salt Lake City, United States	
1000 meters	1:19.42	3 March 2018	AmCup Final	Salt Lake City, United States	
1500 meters	2:02.50	4 March 2018	AmCup Final	Salt Lake City, United States	
3000 meters	4:16.85	10 December 2017	World Cup	Salt Lake City, United States	
5000 meters	7:46.16	14 October 2017	Colombian Championships	Salt Lake City, United States	

== Notes ==
Olympic Games
Preceded by Caterine Ibargüen; Yuberjen Martínez	Flagbearer for Colombia; Beijing 2022 with Carlos Andres Quintana	Succeeded by Flor Ruiz; Kevin Quintero
