= Machetá =

- Municipality and town
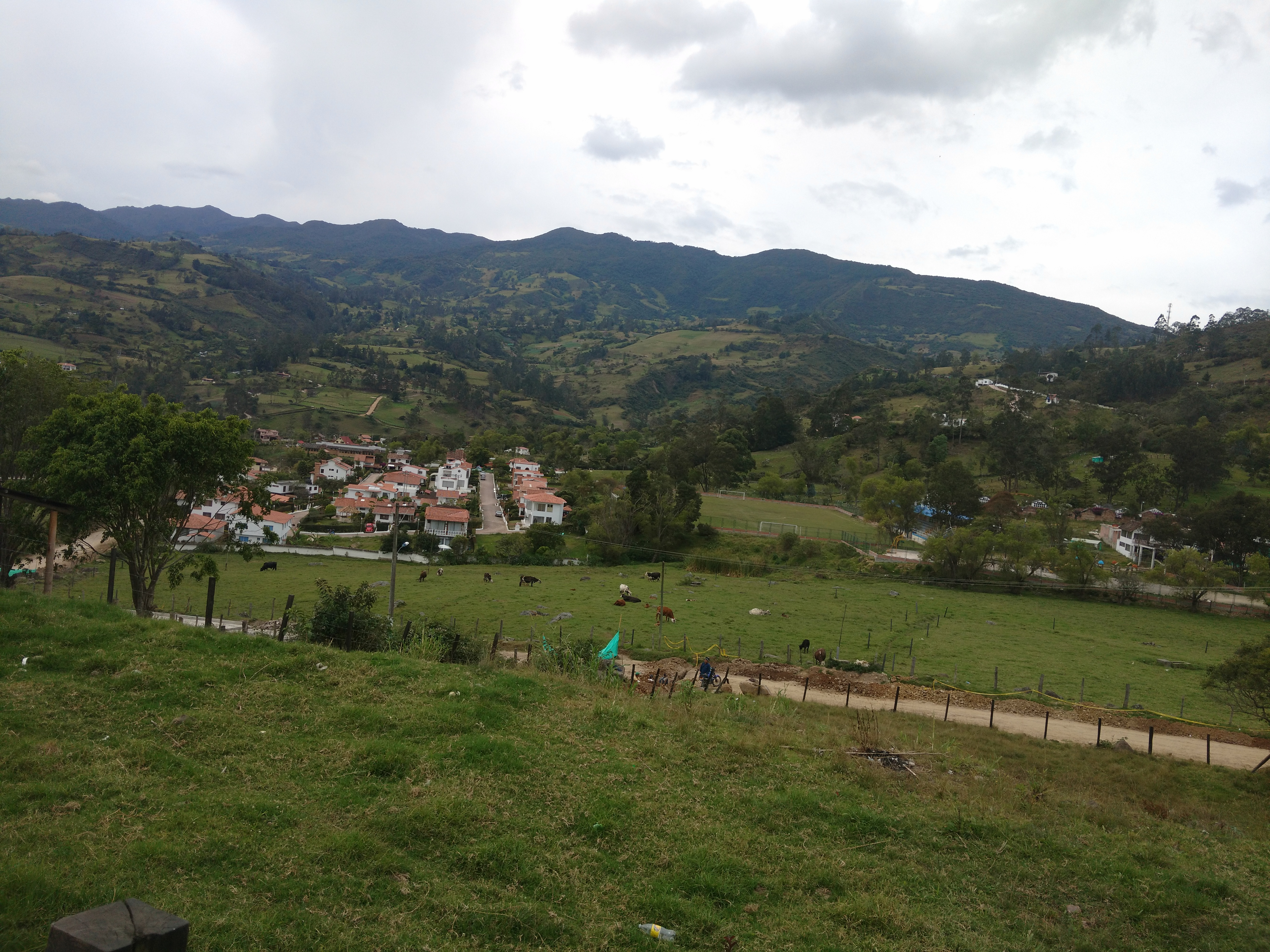
- View of Machetá

- Flag Coat of arms

- Location of the municipality and town inside Cundinamarca Department of Colombia

- Location in Colombia
- Coordinates: 5°4′48.78″N 73°36′26.91″W
- Country: Colombia
- Department: Cundinamarca
- Province: Almeidas Province
- Founded: 1593
- Founder: Miguel de Ibarra

Government
  - Mayor: Rafael Mauricio Forero Briceño (2016-2019)

Area
  - Municipality and town: 229.35 km^{2} (88.55 sq mi)
  - Urban: 5.35 km^{2} (2.07 sq mi)
- Elevation: 2,094 m (6,870 ft)

Population (2015)
  - Municipality and town: 6,316
  - Density: 27.54/km^{2} (71.32/sq mi)
  - Urban: 1,498
- Time zone: UTC-5 (Colombia Standard Time)
- Website: Official website

Machetá is a municipality and town of Colombia in Almeidas Province of the department of Cundinamarca. Machetá is situated on the Altiplano Cundiboyacense at 82.6 kilometres (51.3 mi) from the capital Bogotá and 74.3 kilometres (46.2 mi) from Tunja. It borders Tibiritá and Manta in the east, Chocontá and Sesquilé in the west and Guatavita and Gachetá in the south.

== Etymology ==
In the Chibcha language of the Muisca, Machetá means "Your honourable farmfields".

== History ==
Machetá in the times before the Spanish conquest was inhabited by the Muisca, organized in their Muisca Confederation. Machetá was ruled by the zaque based in Hunza, currently known as the capital of Boyacá Department Tunja.

Modern Machetá was founded in 1593 by Miguel de Ibarra after a soldier of the army of Gonzalo Jiménez de Quesada first established the town in 1540.

== Economy ==
Main economical activity of Machetá is agriculture with products as papa criolla, arracacha, peas and tomatoes.
