= José Domingo Sánchez =

Colombian sprinter

Personal information
- Nationality: Colombian
- Born: José Domingo Sánchez Leal; 20 March 1906 Cartagena, Colombia
- Died: 1979 (aged 72–73) Panama

Sport
- Sport: Sprinting
- Event: 100 metres
Medal record
Men's athletics
Representing Colombia
Bolivarian Games
Silver medal – second place	1938 Bogotá	200 m

José Domingo Sánchez Leal (20 March 1906 – 1979) was a Colombian sprinter. During his career, he was one time the most bemedaled sprinter at the Colombian Athletics Championships. He also represented Colombia at the 1936 Summer Olympics in the men's 100 metres and was also the flag bearer. Later on, he became a professor and settled in Panama.

== Biography ==
José Domingo Sánchez Leal was born on 20 March 1906 in Cartagena, Colombia. He was baptised.

Competing as a sprinter, he had won the men's 100 metres in the Bolivarian National Olympiad. His daughter, Miriam, stated that at the time he was the most bemedaled sprinter at the Colombian Athletics Championships. For the 1936 Summer Olympics held in Berlin, Sánchez was selected to compete for Colombia. He was designated as the flag bearer for Colombia during the opening ceremony. At the 1936 Summer Games, he competed in the heats of the men's 100 metres on 2 August against five other athletes. He placed fifth in the round and did not advance further to the quarterfinals. He was also entered to compete in the men's 200 metres and men's 400 metres but did not start in either event. After the Summer Games, Sánchez competed at the 1938 Bolivarian Games held in Bogotá and won the silver medal in the men's 200 metres.

After Sánchez's sporting career, he became a professor for athletics at the Estadio Alfonso López (now the Estadio Américo Montanini) of the National University of Colombia. He later moved to Panama, becoming active in administration roles in sport, and had three daughters. Miriam, one of his daughters, co-founded the Bolívar Table Tennis League and held administration roles for basketball in Bolívar. Sánchez later died in Panama in 1979.
