= Manta, Cundinamarca =

Manta
- Municipality
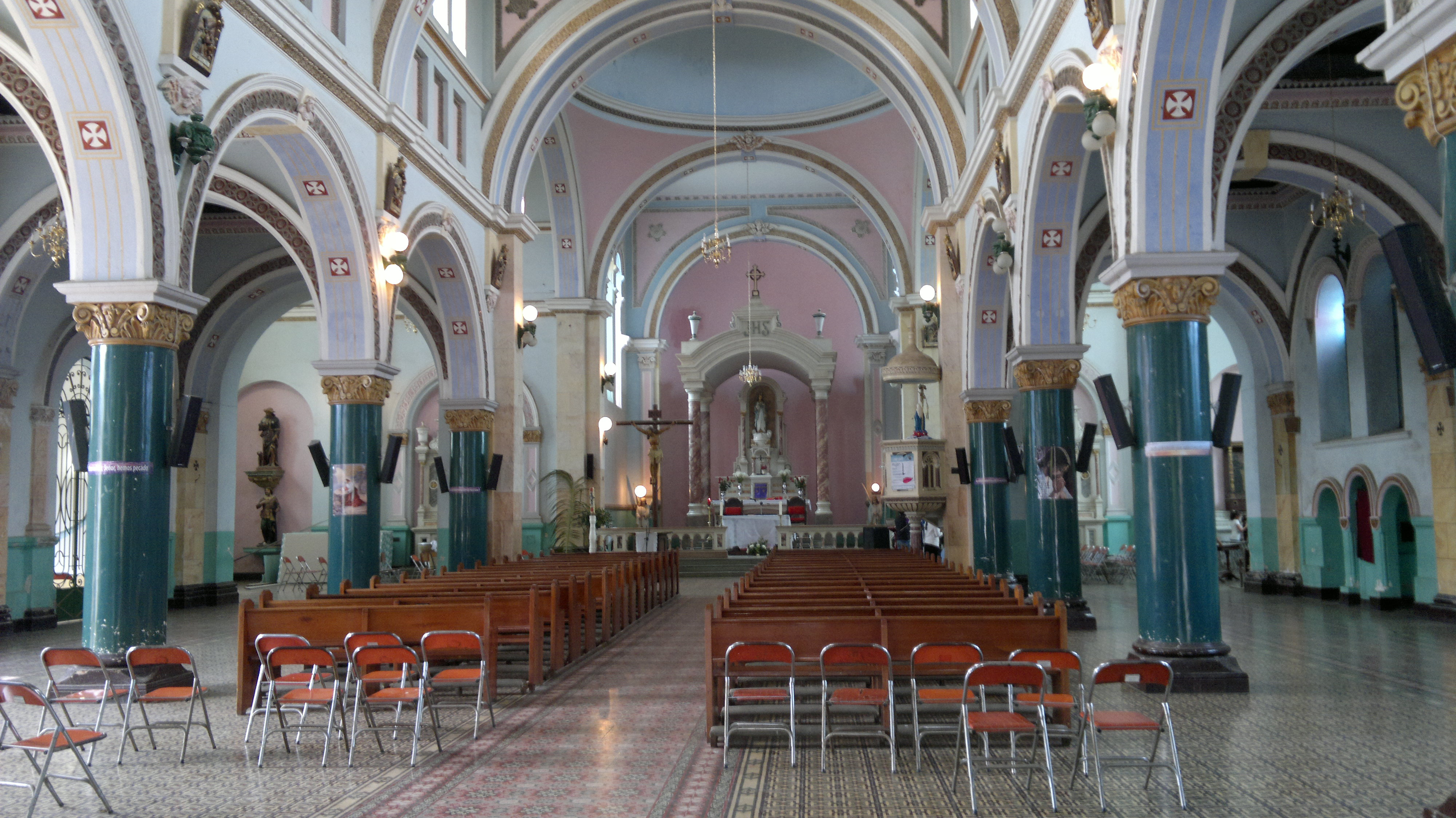
- Interior of the San Joaquín church of Manta

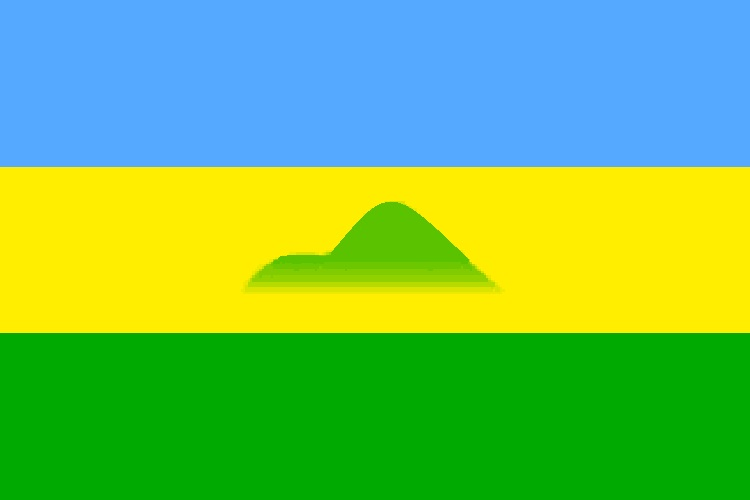
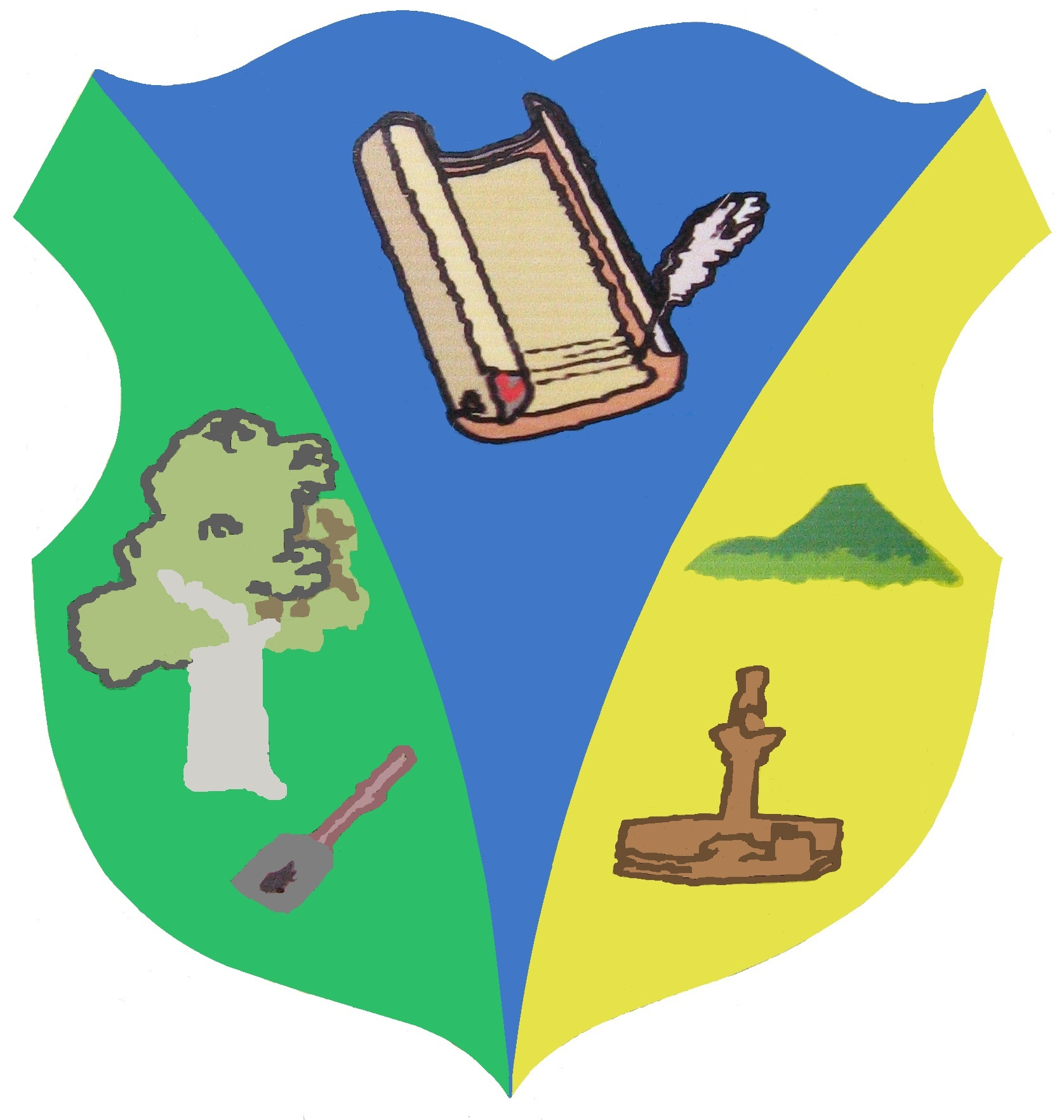
- Flag Coat of arms
- Motto: Retazo de cielo (Sky piece)
- Location of the town and municipality of Manta in Cundinamarca Department

- Location within Colombia
- Coordinates: 5°05′N 73°35′W
- Country: Colombia
- Region: Andean Region
- Department: Cundinamarca
- Province: Almeidas Province
- Founded: 24 July 1773
- Founder: José Joaquín Pompeya

Government
  - Mayor: Edgar Ernesto Robayo Guerrero (2016-2019)

Area
  - Municipality: 105 km^{2} (41 sq mi)
- Elevation: 1,924 m (6,312 ft)

Population (2015)
  - Municipality: 4,719
  - Urban: 1,285
- Website: Official website

Manta is a municipality and town located in the northeast of the department of Cundinamarca (Colombia), 90 kilometres (56 mi) from Bogotá. It is located in the Almeidas Province in the Tenza Valley. Manta borders to the north Tibiritá, to the west Machetá, to the south Gachetá and to the east Guateque and Guayatá of the department of Boyacá.

== Etymology ==
Manta in the Chibcha language of the Muisca means "to your tillage" or "your farmfields". This name comes from the ancient indigenous people who inhabited the territory of the Muisca Confederation. Another Muisca name that remains is the name of the vereda Fuchatoque, located on the eastern side of the city center, headquarters of the former cacique with the same name.

== History ==
=== Pre-Columbian and colonial period ===
The first inhabitants, indigenous Muisca, settled in pre-Columbian times, around the plateau of the current town centre, which was once a small lake. According to the founding myth in the center of the lake was an island, which was sighted in the image of San Joaquín, a name that means the actual building of the Catholic church. Before the arrival of the Spanish conquistadores, Manta was part of the domains and boundaries of the Muisca Confederation, but after the conquest, the indigenous inhabitants were displaced to the neighboring municipality of Tibiritá. The Spanish and mestizos were those who stayed to form the town of Manta.

Modern Manta was founded on July 24, 1773, by José Joaquín Pompeya. Another of the founders was named Juan José Bernal Ramírez.

To set the limits and jurisdiction of the municipality, the territory was formed from the area called "Manta Grande" adding a piece of land that included the old municipality of Guateque.

=== Republican period ===
The constitution of the United States of Colombia created conflicts between federalist and centralist groups, and between conservatives and liberals in the late nineteenth century. One of the key events was a conspiracy by the president of the Federal State of Cundinamarca, General Daniel Aldana (born in Manta), who commanded troops in support of revolutionary and radical integralist federalism in Bogotá, attempted a failed coup State against the President of the Union Rafael Nuñez. After that, Daniel Aldana was removed from office and Cundinamarca became a Federal District by Decree 769 of November 7, 1885, and Gen. Jaime Córdoba would be named governor.

In the early twentieth century, Manta was not exempt from the political violence that hit the country, and for several years was the scene of the war between the traditional parties (liberal and conservative parties). Some roads still show some trenches that over time have been filled with little vegetation.

Manta is also historically known as one of the possible places of birth of Jorge Eliécer Gaitán.

== Geography ==
The territory that makes up the town of Manta is located in the eastern side of the eastern range of the Colombian Andes. It is a steep mountainous terrain irregularities with a single plateau where is located the urban area. These irregularities cause abrupt elevation varies from 1,500 metres (4,900 ft) to 3,400 metres (11,200 ft) of altitude. The maximum altitude is 3400 m that corresponds to the hill of La Laguna also named hill of La Petaca.

Manta is located in a depression formed by the river basin of the Aguacia River that divides the territory into two parts. The territory is bounded by a mountain course that begins and ends in the north where the Machetá River and the Aguacia River form the Sunuba River, tributary of the water reservoir of La Esmeralda ("The Emerald"), in Chivor. At the top of the mountain, is the Laguna del Cerro ("Lake of the Hill"), which has been established as a nature reserve area of the municipality. There are several creeks and streams along the mountain river flowing into the 'Aguacia river'. Some of these streams as it descends through the mountains and waterfalls form the creek of El Golpe ("The Strike").

== Climate ==
Manta is located in the eastern side of the Andes mountains, the climate of Manta has the distinction of being influenced more by the winds from the Llanos Orientales of Colombia. The climate is very pleasant most of the year, presenting an average temperature between 18 and 23 °C (73.4 °F). It is a dry equatorial climate for the forest ecosystem of high mountain (high Andean forest or cloud forest). Despite being affected by the phenomenon of El Niño and in most of Colombia, in the storms and heavy rain periods of La Niña the weather of Manta remains drier compared to the region of the Bogotá savanna.

The rainy season runs from mid-April to mid-November. The driest months are December and January. Extreme temperatures recorded in the city center have been 11 °C (51.8 °F) the coldest and 28 °C (82.4 °F) the warmest.

== Demographics ==
The town's inhabitants are mostly descendants of early Spanish colonists and the Muisca. The population has decreased since the 1960s, due to migration to big cities like Bogotá. However, because of its location near the Sabana de Bogotá, Manta has become a place of rest and holiday, mainly of people who keep a link with the municipality. This makes the population varies significantly throughout the year, especially during vacation seasons, weekends and bank holidays. Manta is regularly inhabited by a population of about 4,500 inhabitants, however, in times of greatest influx of nonresident population this figure can vary between 10,000 and 16,000 inhabitants without counting the number of tourists.

== Tourism ==
In recent years, Manta has become a place of rest from the hectic life of the big cities. There are some natural tourist destinations like the Quebrada El Golpe, the Laguna de la Petaca, and the Cerro de la Petaca. The lake El Golpe is located at 3,200 metres (10,500 ft) above sea level and has become a nature reserve next to adjacent native forest and Cerro de la Petaca. This reserve is under the administration of the municipality, and is visited on annual trips scheduled in the first week of January.

The municipality also has developed infrastructure for sports and recreational activities such as a stadium, the sports center and the municipal swimming pool.

== Gallery ==
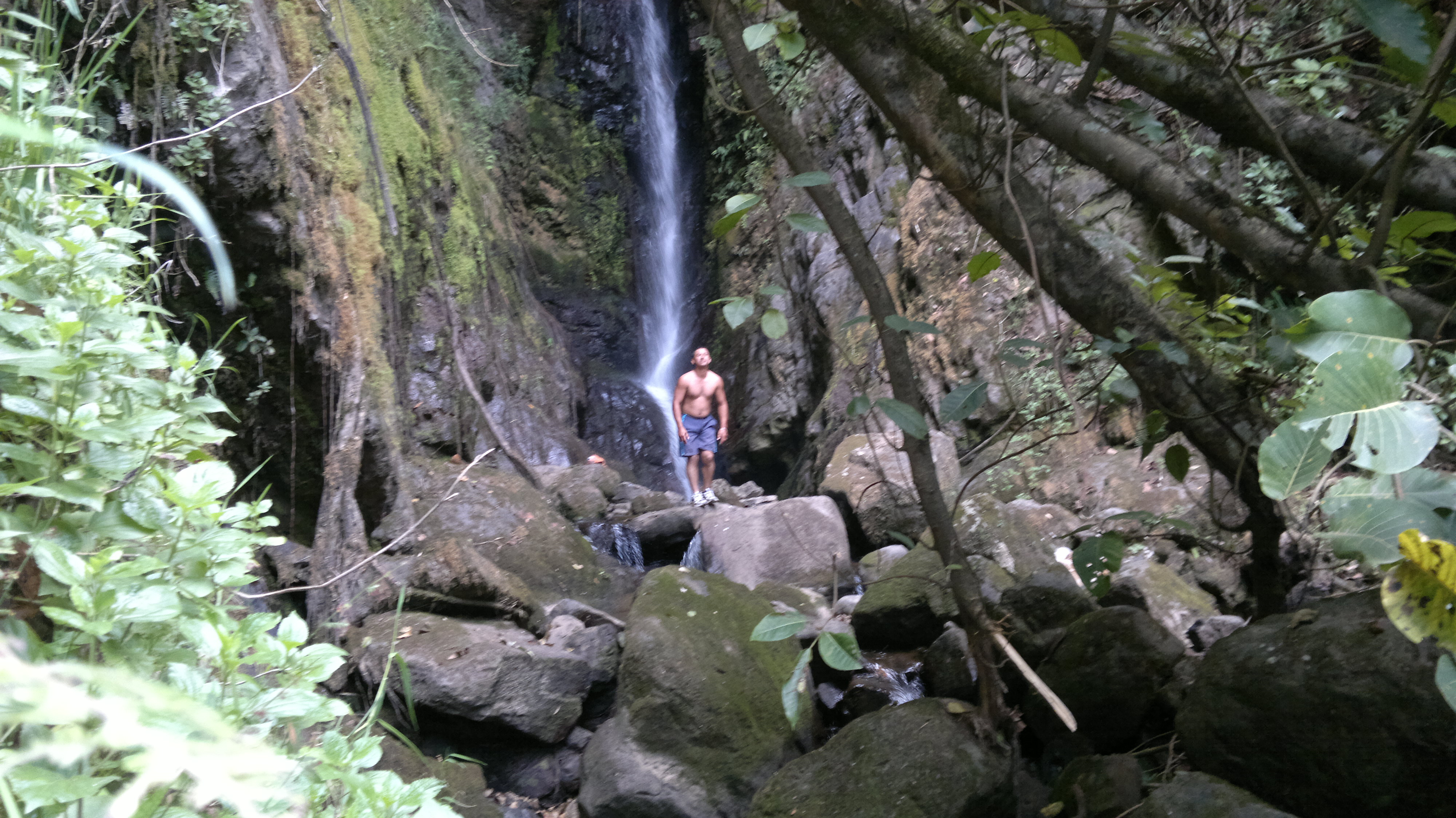
Quebrada El Golpe

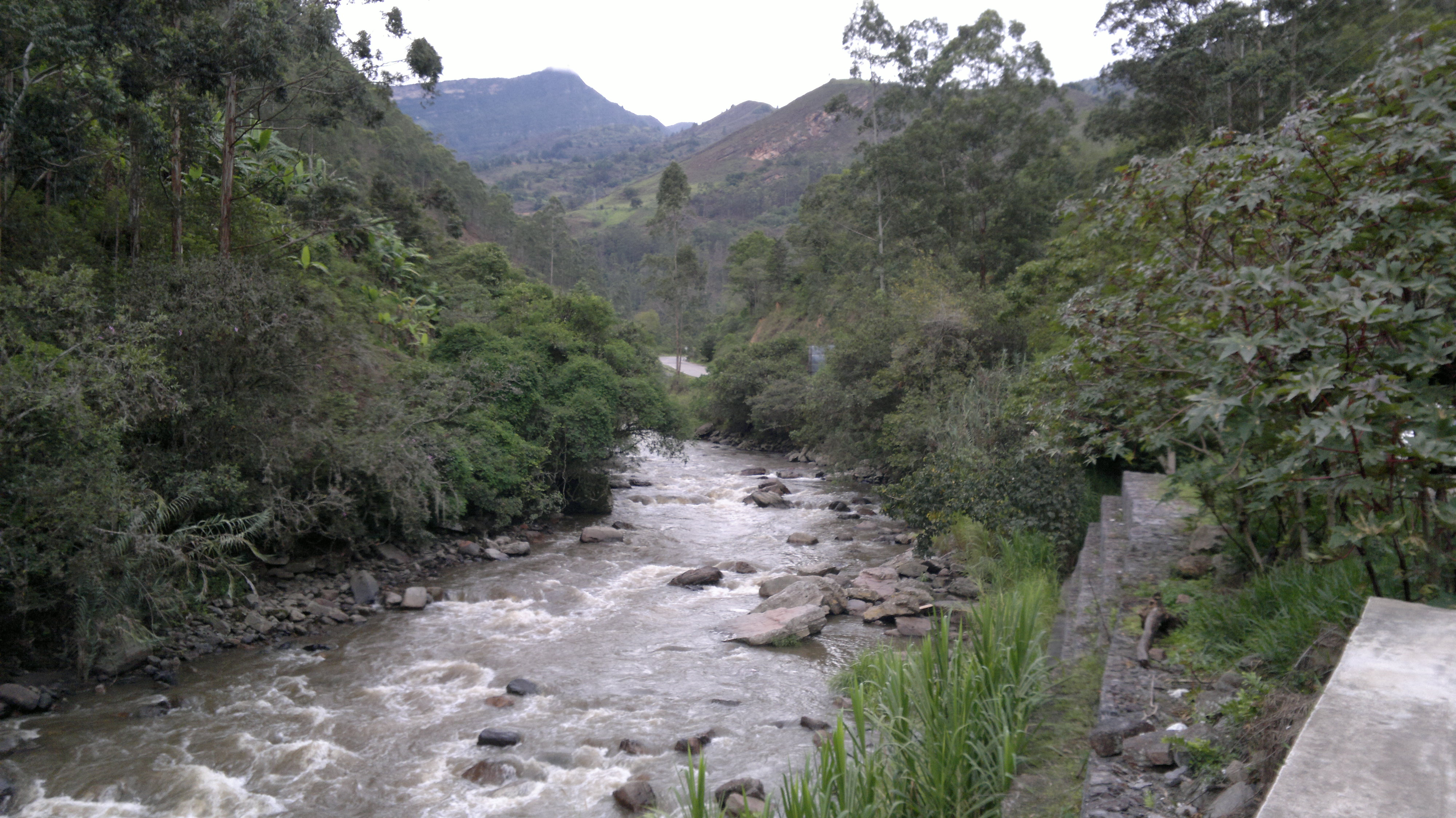
Aguacia River
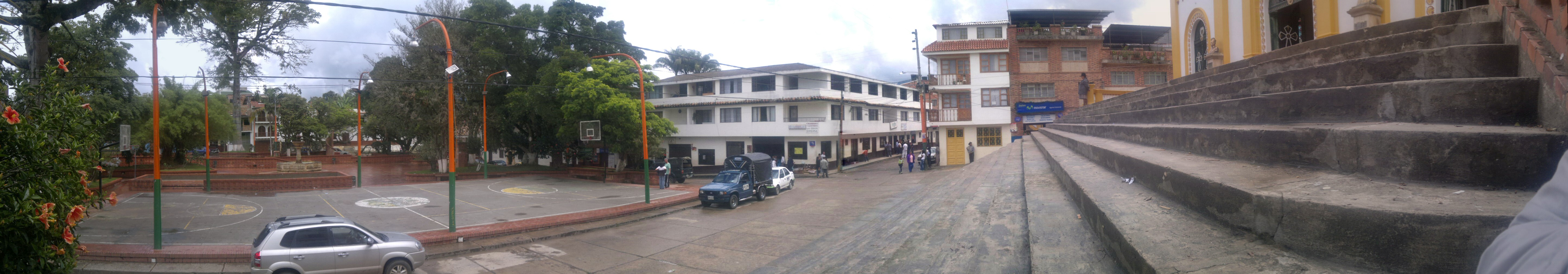
Panorama of central Manta

== Bibliography ==
- Espejo Olaya, Maria Bernarda (1999), Notas sobre toponimia en algunas coplas colombianas - Notes about toponomy of some Colombian ballads - Thesaurus (PDF) (in Spanish), vol. 54, pp. 1102–1157
