= Tibiritá =

Tibirita
- Municipality and town
- Flag

- Location of Tibirita inside Cundinamarca Department of Colombia

- Location in Colombia
- Coordinates: 5°03′04″N 73°30′15″W
- Country: Colombia
- Department: Cundinamarca
- Province: Almeidas Province
- Founded: 9 July 1593
- Founder: Miguel de Ibarra

Government
  - Mayor: Maria Antonia Martín Mateus (2020-2023)

Area
  - Municipality and town: 57.2 km^{2} (22.1 sq mi)
  - Urban: 0.26 km^{2} (0.10 sq mi)
- Elevation: 1,980 m (6,500 ft)

Population (2015)
  - Municipality and town: 2,950
  - Density: 51.6/km^{2} (134/sq mi)
  - Urban: 492
- Time zone: UTC-5 (Colombia Standard Time)
- Website: Official website

Tibirita is a municipality and town of Colombia in the department of Cundinamarca. Tibirita is situated on the Altiplano Cundiboyacense at a distance of 125 kilometres (78 mi) from the capital Bogotá. It borders Villapinzón in the north, in the east La Capilla (Boyacá), in the south Guateque (Boyacá) and in the west Manta, Machetá and Chocontá.

== History ==
The area of Tibiritá was populated by the Muisca before the Spanish conquest of the Muisca in the 1530s. The village was ruled by the zaque of Hunza, present day capital of Boyacá Tunja. Modern Tibiritá was founded on July 9, 1553 by Miguel de Ibarra. The name Tibiritá is Chibcha.

== Economy ==
Main economical activity of Tibiritá is dairy farming.

== Born in Tibirita ==
- Rufino Cuervo Barreto, 4 months president of the Republic of New Granada
