= Villapinzón =

Villapinzón Hato Viejo
- Municipality and town
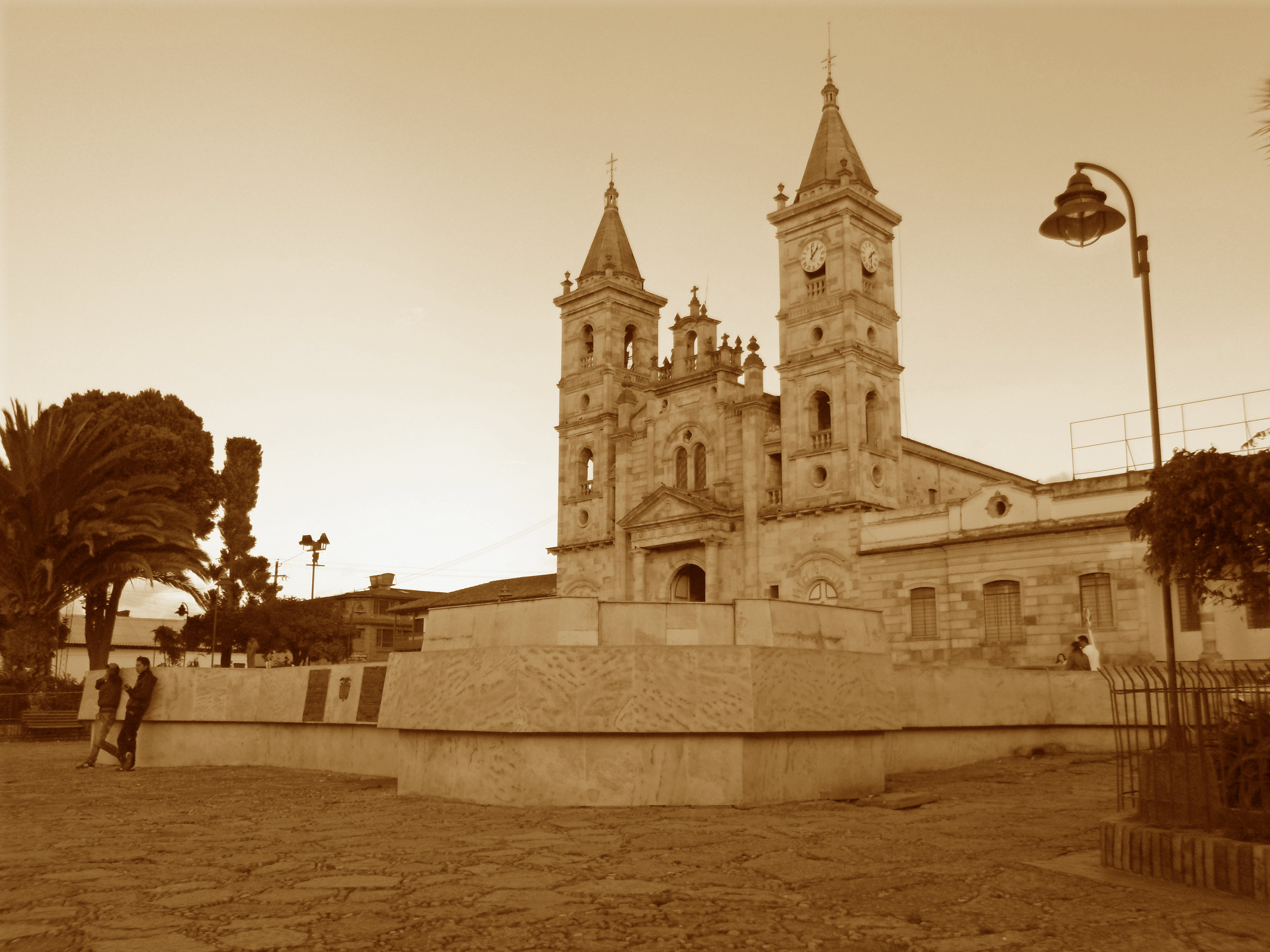
- Church of Villapinzón

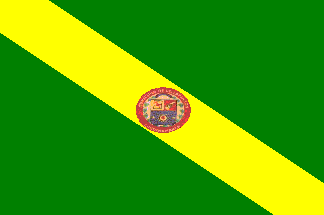
- Flag Coat of arms

- Location in Colombia
- Coordinates: 5°13′N 73°36′W
- Country: Colombia
- Department: Cundinamarca
- Province: Almeidas Province
- Founded: 14 October 1776
- Founder: Francisco de Vargas Figueroa

Government
  - Mayor: Gildardo Ansisar Melo Garnica (2016-2019)

Area
  - Municipality and town: 249 km^{2} (96 sq mi)
  - Urban: 0.39 km^{2} (0.15 sq mi)
- Elevation: 2,715 m (8,907 ft)

Population (2015)
  - Municipality and town: 19,742
  - Density: 79.3/km^{2} (205/sq mi)
  - Urban: 6,526
- Time zone: UTC-5 (Colombia Standard Time)
- Website: Official website

Villapinzón is a municipality and town of Colombia in the Almeidas Province, part of the department of Cundinamarca. The urban centre is situated at an elevation of 2,715 metres (8,907 ft) on the Altiplano Cundiboyacense, at a distance of 80 kilometres (50 mi) from the capital Bogotá. Villapinzón borders Ventaquemada (Boyacá) and Lenguazaque in the north, Chocontá, Tibiritá and La Capilla in the south, Chocontá and Lenguazaque in the west and Ventaquemada, Turmequé and Úmbita in the east. The municipality is located in the uppermost part of the Bogotá River Basin; the origin of the river is within the municipality Villapinzón at an elevation of 3,400 metres (11,200 ft).

== Etymology ==
Villapinzón was named Hato Viejo for most of its history. In 1903, the name was changed to "Pinzón", honouring Próspero Pinzón Romero, commander of the army and Minister of War of Colombia under Colombian president José Manuel Marroquín. Próspero Pinzón Romero was born in Hato Viejo. A year later, it became Villapinzón.

== History ==
The history of Villapinzón is relatively young; historian Ramón Correa studied the pre-Columbian history of the area and did not find evidence Villapinzón was populated before the Spanish conquest of the Muisca. Villapinzón was founded on October 14, 1776 by Francisco de Vargas Figueroa.

== Economy ==
Economically, Villapinzón is characterized by a large tannery (curtido) industry. Additionally, agriculture and livestock farming are important.

== Born in Villapinzón ==
- Próspero Pinzón, namesake of the municipality and Minister of War
- Rodrigo Contreras, professional cyclist
- Efraím Rico, former professional cyclist

== Gallery ==
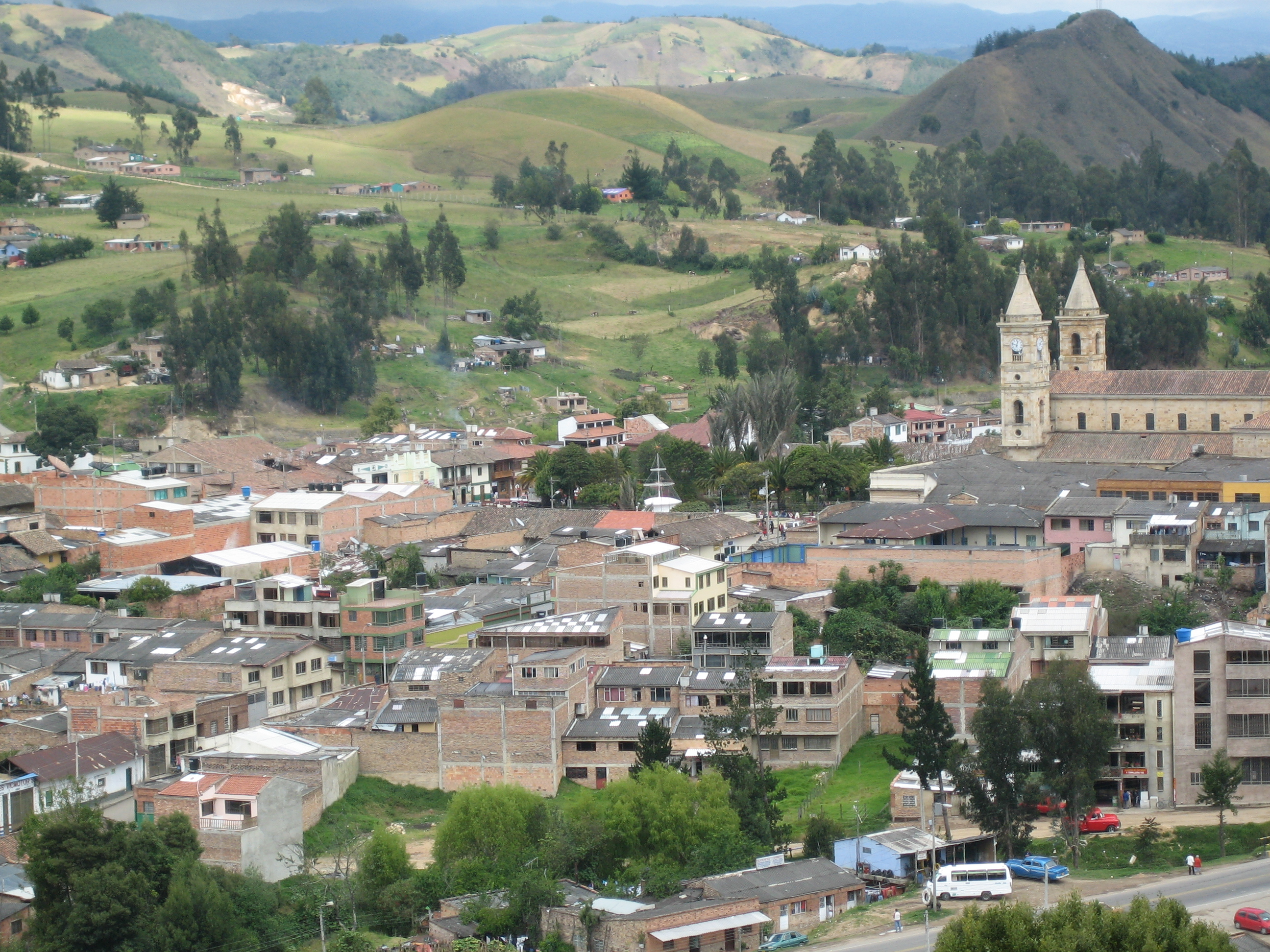
View of Villapinzón from Altamira

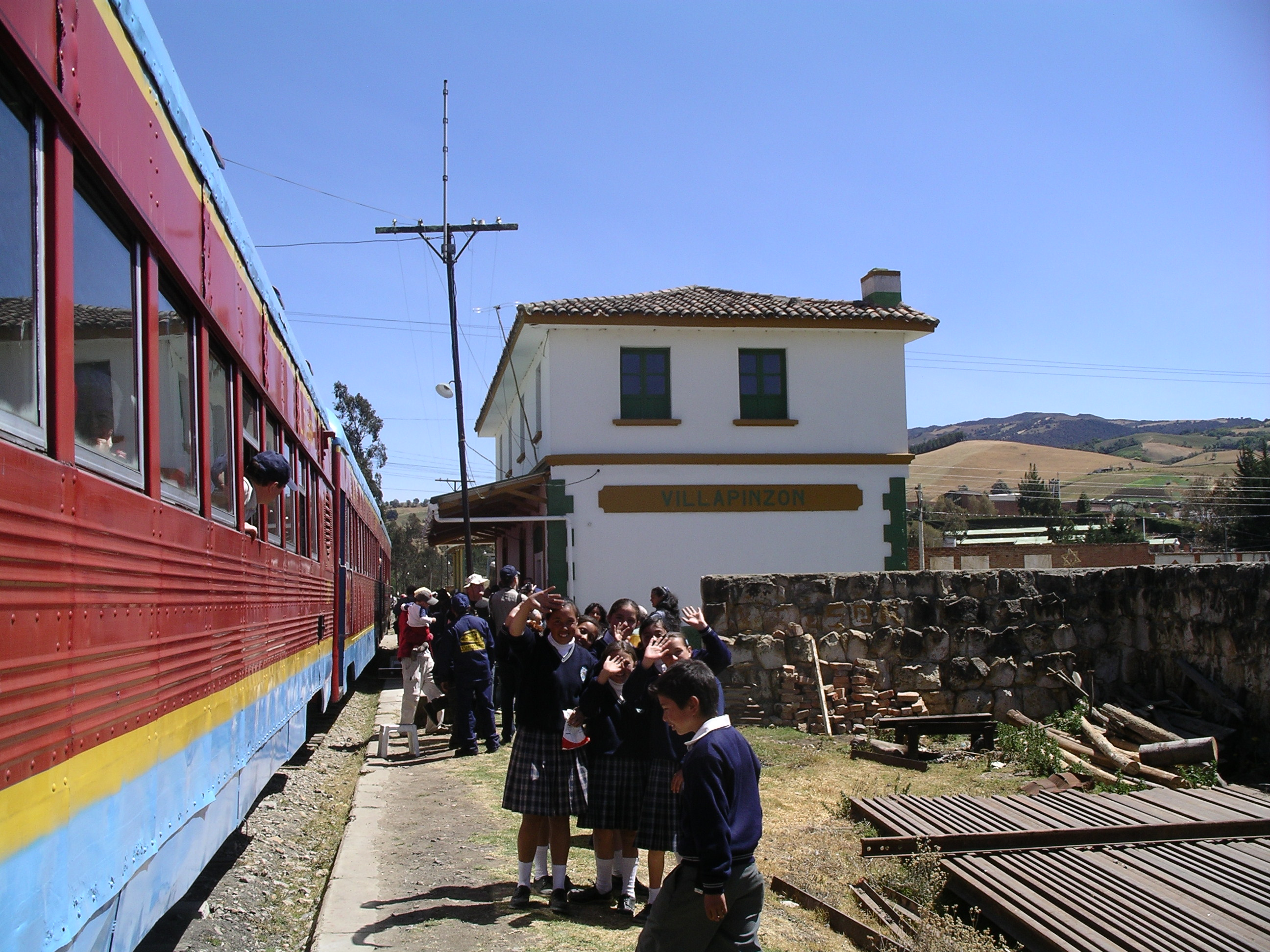
Train station

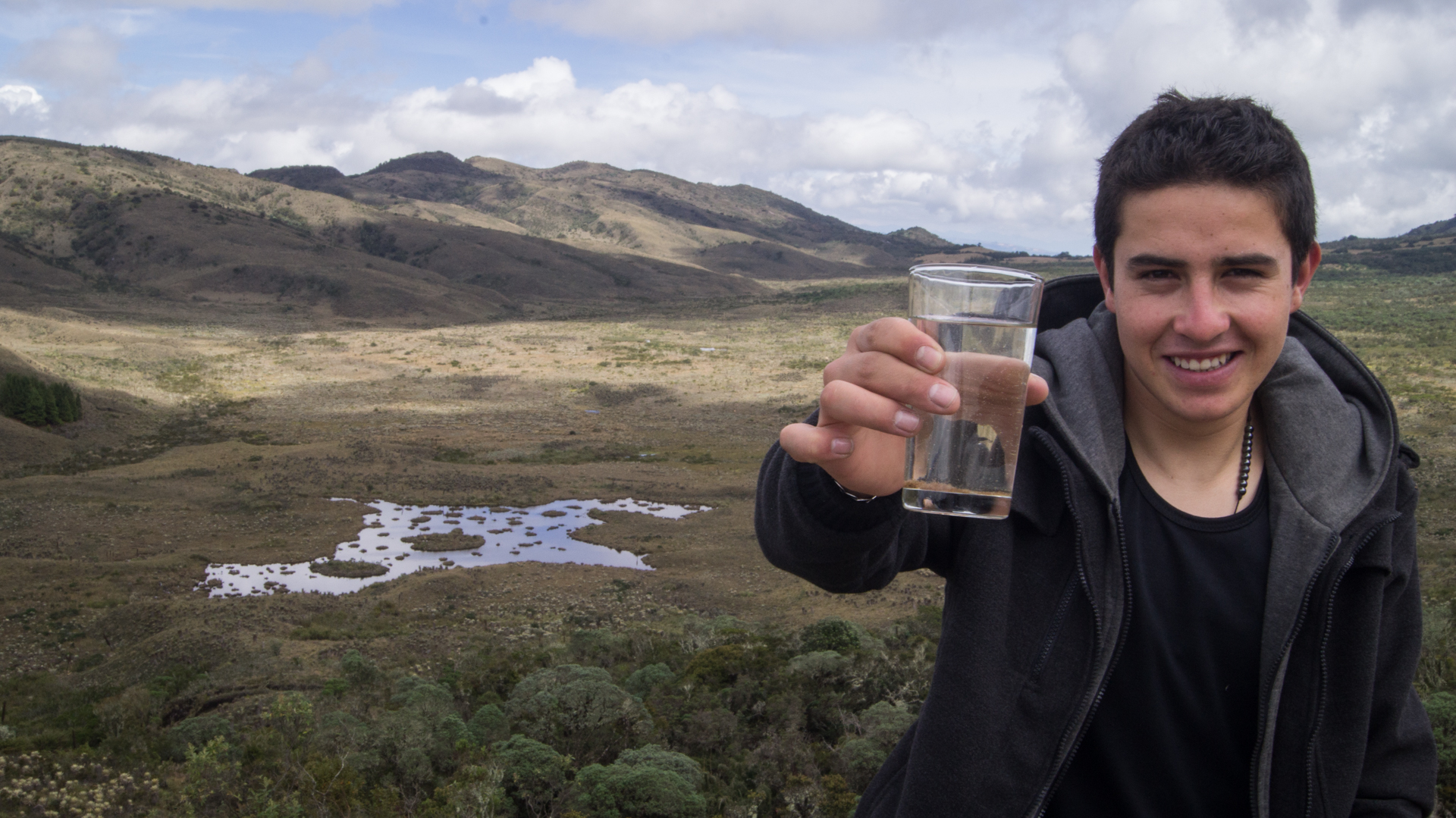
Headwaters of the Bogotá River
