= Emirto de Lima =

Colombian composer (1890–1972)

- Born: José María Emirto de Lima y Sintiago; 25 January 1890; Willemstad, Curaçao
- Died: 14 August 1972 (aged 82); Barranquilla, Colombia
- Occupation: Composer

José María Emirto de Lima y Sintiago (25 January 1890 – 14 August 1972) was a Dutch (Note: Most likely a Dutch national at the time.) composer, conductor, music critic and music teacher.

== Biography ==
José María Emirto de Lima y Sintiago was born on 25 January 1890 in Willemstad, Curaçao, to Paul Quirino de Lima (1861 – 1926) and Josefina Sintiago. While living in Curaçao, de Lima was taught how to play the violin and piano by his father. Later while located in Barcelona and Paris, he was further educated by Felip Pedrell and Vincent d'Indy, respectively. De Lima later moved to Baranquilla to take up a music job offer originally meant for his father.

De Lima was a teacher in a music academy in the city and was at one point the Honorary Consul in Barranquilla for the countries of Honduras and Liberia. He later released his first music compositions in 1911 and became a conductor for radio the following decade. He later became an orchestra conductor. Most of his works were in the Antillean waltz and Mazurka styles. He later traveled to Caracas and composed a piece based on text written by poet and periodist Polita de Lima about the Coro dunes.

As a competitor at the art competitions at the 1932 Summer Olympics in Los Angeles, United States, he had represented Colombia in the music competition. The competition was held from 30 July to 14 August, though only a silver medal was awarded. De Lima did not place.

In Colombia, de Lima became the first person to publish local traditional music, listing down songs and oral traditions around the country and released it under the title of "Folklore Colombiano" in 1942. He had also founded the Philharmonic Orchestra of Barranquilla and produced compositions with the orchestra in 1943. During his career, he had composed multiple ballets and concertos, and critiqued music. After being involved in a traffic accident, de Lima succumbed to his injuries on 14 August 1972 in Colombia. His injuries were left untreated due to inadequate resources in his area needed to heal him.
