= Colombia at the 1936 Summer Olympics =

- IOC code: COL
- NOC: Colombian Olympic Committee

in Berlin
- Competitors: 5 in 1 sport
- Flag bearer: José Domingo Sánchez
- Medals: Gold 0 Silver 0 Bronze 0 Total 0

Summer Olympics appearances (overview)
- 1932; 1936; 1948; 1952; 1956; 1960; 1964; 1968; 1972; 1976; 1980; 1984; 1988; 1992; 1996; 2000; 2004; 2008; 2012; 2016; 2020; 2024; 2028

Colombia at the 1936 Summer Olympics in Berlin, Germany was the nation's second appearance at the tenth edition of the Summer Olympic Games.

== Athletics ==
Sport	Athletes	Discipline	Place	Results
Athletics	José Domingo Sánchez	100 m	Heat 3, 5th	Did Not Advance
Athletics	Elias Gutierrez	100 m	Heat 4, 6th	Did Not Advance
Athletics	Elias Gutierrez	Men's javelin throw	35.0, 28th	Did Not Advance
Athletics	Emilio Torres	1500 m	Semifinal 3, 11th	Did Not Advance
Athletics	Hernando Navarrete	5000 m	Heat 3, 12th	Did Not Advance
Athletics	Pedro del Vecchio	Triple jump	Unknown	Did Not Advance

== See also ==
- Sports in Colombia
