= List of Colombian records in speed skating =

The following are the national records in speed skating in Colombia maintained by the Colombia Federation of Skating Sports.

== Men ==
Event	Record	Athlete	Date	Meet	Place	Ref
500 meters	34.92	Pedro Causil	8 December 2017	World Cup	Salt Lake City, United States	
500 meters × 2						
1000 meters	1:08.83	Pedro Causil	2 December 2017	World Cup	Calgary, Canada	
1500 meters	1:48.30	Diego Amaya	27 February 2021	Time Trials	Salt Lake City, United States	
3000 meters	3:47.44	Germán Tirado	27 February 2021	Time Trials	Salt Lake City, United States	
5000 meters	6:30.70	Germán Tirado	2 October 2021	Time Trials	Salt Lake City, United States	
10000 meters	13:35.29	Germán Tirado	25 September 2021	Time Trials	Salt Lake City, United States	
Team pursuit (8 laps)	3:59.12	Diego Amaya; Germán Tirado; Daniel Zapata	17 December 2021	Four Continents Championships	Calgary, Canada	
Sprint combination	163.810 pts	Camilo Echeverri	20–21 March 2010	Olympic Oval Final	Calgary, Canada	
Small combination						
Big combination	196.762 pts	Jay Ramirez	24–25 March 2014	Grote Meerkamp, Schaatstrainingsgroep Wageningen	Heerenveen, Netherlands	

== Women ==
Event	Record	Athlete	Date	Meet	Place	Ref
500 meters	41.05	Laura Michelle Rodríguez	20 October 2022	AmCup	Salt Lake City, United States	
500 meters × 2						
1000 meters	1:19.42	Laura Gómez	3 March 2018	AmCup Final	Salt Lake City, United States	
1500 meters	2:02.50	Laura Gómez	4 March 2018	AmCup Final	Salt Lake City, United States	
3000 meters	4:14.43	Laura Gómez	10 December 2021	World Cup	Calgary, Canada	
5000 meters	7:26.06	Laura Gómez	23 October 2021	AmCup #1	Salt Lake City, United States	
10000 meters						
Team pursuit (6 laps)						
Sprint combination						
Mini combination						
Small combination						

== Mixed ==
Event	Record	Athlete	Date	Meet	Place	Ref
Relay	3:11.34	Luna Díaz; Ángelo Verdugo	1 March 2026	World Junior Championships	Inzell, Germany	
