= Cynthia Denzler =

Colombian-American-Swiss alpine skier

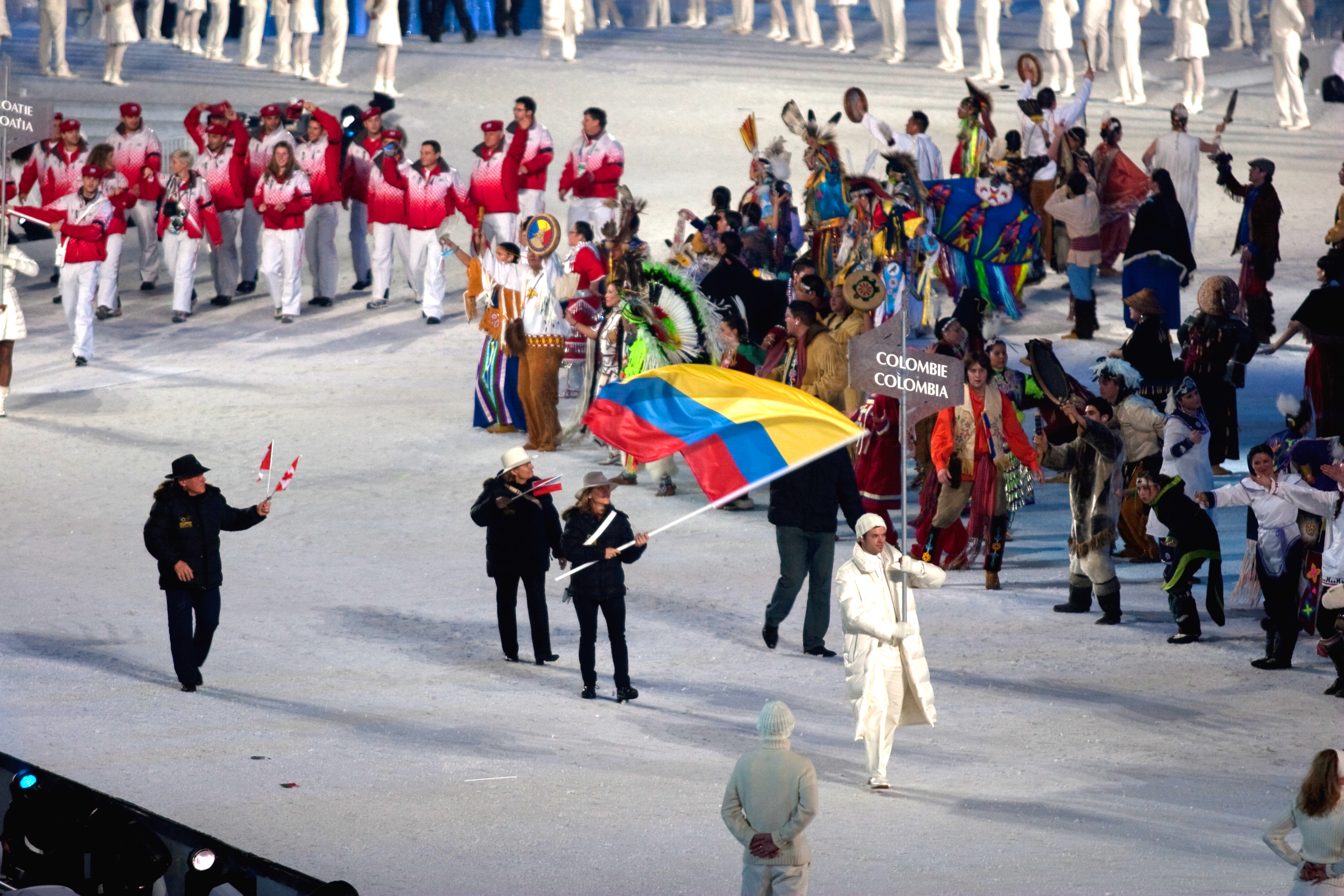

Personal information
- Born: May 12, 1983 (age 43) Santa Ana, California, U.S.
- Height: 1.61 m (5 ft 3 1/2 in)
- Website: colombiaski.com

Skiing career
- Sport: Alpine skiing
- Club: Club Deportivo Davoss Pereira
- Disciplines: Giant slalom, slalom

Olympics
- Teams: 1 – (2010)
- Medals: 0

World Championships
- Teams: 1 – (2009)
- Medals: 0

Cynthia Jennifer "Cici" Denzler (born May 12, 1983 in Santa Ana, California) is a Colombian–American–Swiss alpine skier. She competed for Colombia at the 2010 Winter Olympics in the women's slalom and giant slalom skiing competitions. Denzler was the first athlete to represent Colombia at the Winter Olympic Games.

== Personal life ==
Denzler was born in Santa Ana, California, on May 12, 1983. Her parents are Swiss. Denzler and her parents moved to Switzerland, where she still lives, when she was four years old. Denzler began skiing when she was eight years old.

Denzler's father, who is also her coach, first arrived to Colombia in 2000 to open a clothes factory. Denzler acquired her Colombian citizenship through her father's residence and activities in Colombia.

She is a graduate of California Coast University.

Denzler's nickname is "Cici". She gained this nickname from a Swiss nanny who found that she could not pronounce Cynthia and decided to call Denzler "Cici" instead.

== Skiing career ==
=== United States ===
Denzler debuted internationally for the USA as an alpine skier in 1998.

=== Colombia ===
Denzler started representing Colombia from 2008. In 2010, Cynthia Denzler competed as part of Colombia's Winter Olympics delegation which consisted of her father Hanspeter, and his brother Fabian, both of which served as coaches. Cynthia Denzler said, "it is an honour to compete for Colombia and I am happy to do so. Representing the country during the Winter Olympics is a good thing and a dream come true." She carried the Colombian flag at the opening ceremony.

== Alpine skiing results ==
All results are sourced from the International Ski Federation (FIS).

=== Olympic results ===
Year
Year	Age	Slalom	Giant; Slalom	Super-G	Downhill	Combined	Team Event
2010	26	51	DNF	—	—	—	—

=== World Championship results ===
Year	Age	Slalom	Giant slalom	Super-G	Downhill	Combined
2009	25	DNF1	DNF1	—	—	—

== See also ==
- Colombia at the 2010 Winter Olympics

Olympic Games
Preceded by María Luisa Calle	Flagbearer for Colombia; Vancouver 2010	Succeeded by Mariana Pajón
