= Colombia at the 1932 Summer Olympics =

- IOC code: COL

in Los Angeles
- Competitors: 1 in 1 sports
- Flag bearer: Jorge Perry
- Medals: Gold 0 Silver 0 Bronze 0 Total 0

Summer Olympics appearances (overview)
- 1932; 1936; 1948; 1952; 1956; 1960; 1964; 1968; 1972; 1976; 1980; 1984; 1988; 1992; 1996; 2000; 2004; 2008; 2012; 2016; 2020; 2024

Colombia competed in the Summer Olympic Games for the first time at the 1932 Summer Olympics in Los Angeles, United States. Two people traveled to represent Colombia, musician Emirto de Lima and marathon runner Jorge Perry. Colombia did not have an Olympic committee but agreed to sponsor Perry to train in America for four months before the event. He did not finish the marathon due to fainting after the first 10 km.

== Athletics ==
Athlete	Event	Final	
Athlete	Event	Result	Rank
Jorge Perry	Marathon	DNF	

== See also ==
- Sports in Colombia
