= Samacá =

Coordinates: 5°30′N 73°29′W

- Municipality and town
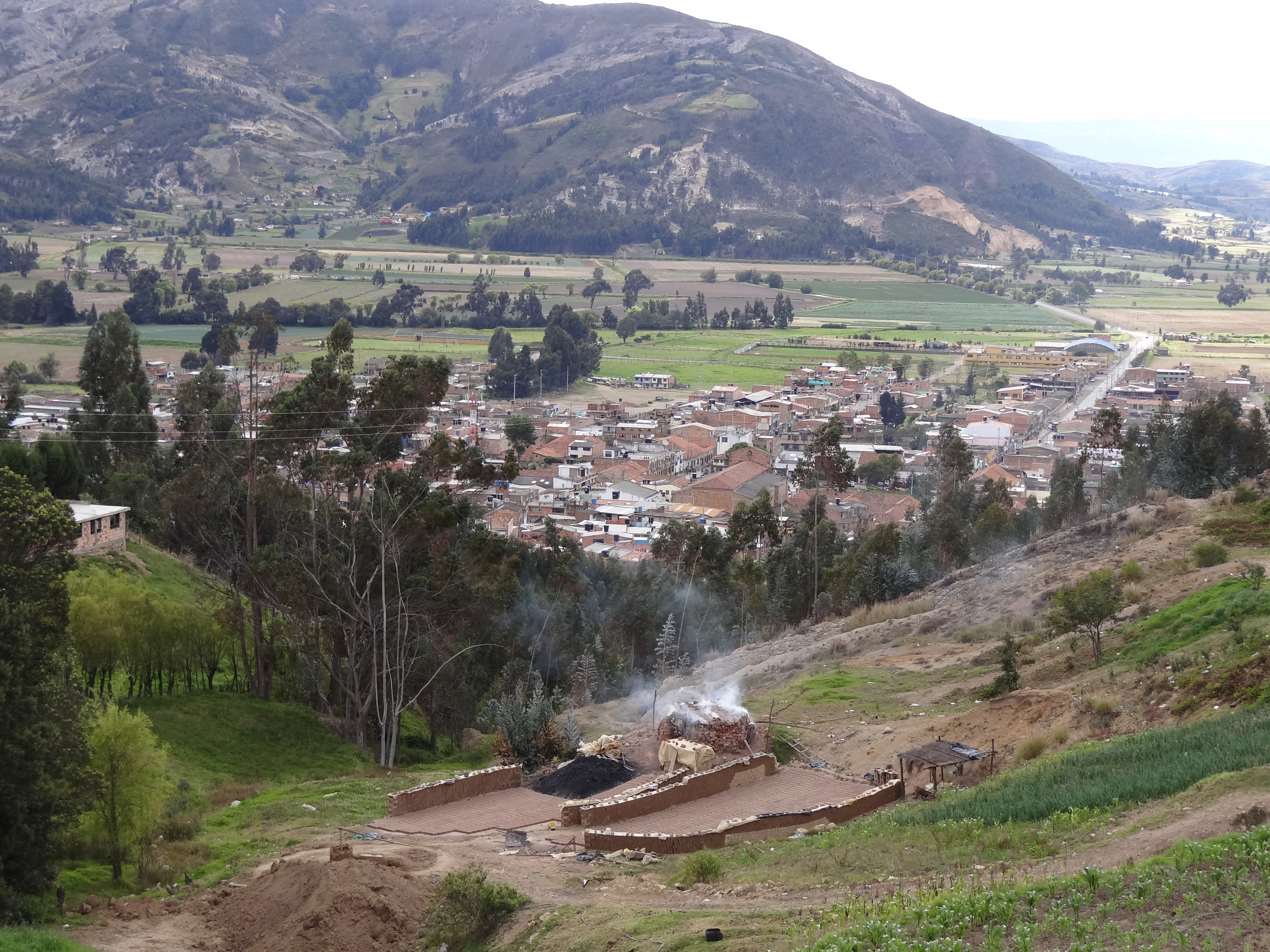
- View of Samacá

- Flag

- Location of the municipality and town of Samacá in the Boyacá Department of Colombia
- Country: Colombia
- Department: Boyacá Department
- Province: Central Boyacá Province
- Founded: 1 January 1556
- Founder: Juan de los Barrios

Government
  - Mayor: Luis Alberto Aponte Gómez (2020-2023)

Area
  - Municipality and town: 172.9 km^{2} (66.8 sq mi)
  - Urban: 1.2 km^{2} (0.46 sq mi)
- Elevation: 2,660 m (8,730 ft)

Population (2015)
  - Municipality and town: 19,907
  - Density: 115.1/km^{2} (298.2/sq mi)
  - Urban: 5,908
- Time zone: UTC-5 (Colombia Standard Time)
- Website: Official website

Samacá is a town and municipality in the Central Boyacá Province, part of the Colombian Department of Boyacá. It borders Cucaita, Tunja and Ventaquemada in the east, Ráquira in the west, Sáchica, Sora and Cucaita in the north and Ventaquemada, Ráquira and Guachetá, Cundinamarca in the south.

== Etymology ==
Samacá's original name came from the Chibcha native language of the area. Samacá was a small village before the Spanish conquest of the Muisca. Sa is a noble title; Ma is a proper name; Cá means a sovereign enclosure.

== History ==
Samacá began as a settlement of a large lagoon which was known by the native name of "Lake of Cansicá" or "Valley of the Lake" (la laguna de Cansicá). Around the lagoon were three native settlements called Patagüy, Foacá and Sáchica. Samacá was ruled by the zaque of nearby Hunza and the modern town was founded on January 1, 1556 by Juan de los Barrios.

== Economy ==
The most important activities are farming, cattle, and mining. Samacá produces potatoes, peas, corn, and beet. Coal mining is the largest industry and most of the production of coal is exported. Samacá has a potential for growth; in the last decade the economy has risen tremendously. Samacá is open to international investment.

== Born in Samacá ==
- Pedro Saúl Morales, former professional cyclist
- Jorge Perry, Colombia's first olympic competitor

== Climate ==
Climate data for Samacá (Villa Carmen), elevation 2,600 m (8,500 ft), (1981–2010)
Month	Jan	Feb	Mar	Apr	May	Jun	Jul	Aug	Sep	Oct	Nov	Dec	Year
Mean daily maximum °C (°F)	19.9 (67.8)	20.0 (68.0)	20.1 (68.2)	19.5 (67.1)	19.2 (66.6)	18.2 (64.8)	17.6 (63.7)	17.7 (63.9)	18.4 (65.1)	19.1 (66.4)	19.2 (66.6)	19.4 (66.9)	19.1 (66.4)
Daily mean °C (°F)	14.0 (57.2)	14.2 (57.6)	14.4 (57.9)	14.5 (58.1)	14.4 (57.9)	13.8 (56.8)	13.3 (55.9)	13.3 (55.9)	13.7 (56.7)	14.0 (57.2)	14.1 (57.4)	14.0 (57.2)	14.0 (57.2)
Mean daily minimum °C (°F)	7.4 (45.3)	8.4 (47.1)	8.9 (48.0)	9.4 (48.9)	9.5 (49.1)	9.2 (48.6)	8.7 (47.7)	8.6 (47.5)	8.1 (46.6)	8.5 (47.3)	8.9 (48.0)	7.9 (46.2)	8.6 (47.5)
Average precipitation mm (inches)	29.9 (1.18)	50.1 (1.97)	74.0 (2.91)	83.5 (3.29)	76.6 (3.02)	39.2 (1.54)	36.9 (1.45)	31.7 (1.25)	47.9 (1.89)	99.5 (3.92)	91.3 (3.59)	42.3 (1.67)	694.8 (27.35)
Average precipitation days (≥ 1.0 mm)	6	8	12	14	16	15	16	15	12	16	14	9	149
Average relative humidity (%)	77	78	79	81	81	81	82	82	81	80	81	80	80
Mean monthly sunshine hours	220.1	183.5	173.6	144.0	155.0	150.0	173.6	173.6	165.0	161.2	159.0	192.2	2,050.8
Mean daily sunshine hours	7.1	6.5	5.6	4.8	5.0	5.0	5.6	5.6	5.5	5.2	5.3	6.2	5.6
Source: Instituto de Hidrologia Meteorologia y Estudios Ambientales
