= Jorge Perry =

Colombian long-distance runner

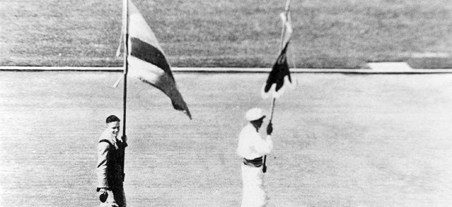
- Villate (left) in 1932

Personal information
- Nationality: Colombian
- Born: Jorge Perry Nova Villate; 1908 Samacá, Boyacá, Colombia
- Died: 29 December 1946 (aged 37–38) Bogotá, Colombia

Sport
- Sport: Long-distance running
- Event: Marathon

Jorge Perry Nova Villate (1908 – 29 December 1946), also known as Jorge Pérez and Jorge Perry, was a Colombian long-distance runner. Though Colombia had initially pulled out of the 1932 Summer Olympics, Villate had asked the International Olympic Committee (IOC) to compete at the games. The IOC then agreed and sponsored his training in the United States.

At the 1932 Summer Games, he would be the first Colombian Olympian. He competed in the men's marathon though fainted and did not complete the race, though he was awarded the IOC Medal of Merit. He was also entered to compete at the 1936 Summer Olympics though did not start in his events.

== Biography ==
Jorge Perry Nova Villate was born in 1908 (Note: An article from El Espectador states that it was 1910.) in Samacá, Colombia, to a Scottish father, who was born in Scotland but moved to Colombia at the age of six, and a Colombian mother. Growing up, Villate competed in races in various distances at the age of seven.

Colombia had initially pulled out of the 1932 Summer Olympics due to financial constraints. The nation did not have a National Olympic Committee at the time so Villate, a topographical engineer at the time, had asked the International Olympic Committee (IOC) to compete at the games. The IOC agreed and even sponsored travel to the United States four months early for his preparations. Prior to the games, he resided in the Consulate of Colombia in Los Angeles.

At the 1932 Summer Games in Los Angeles, United States, he would be the only athlete to compete for Colombia. It was also the first time the nation had ever been represented at a games, making him the first Colombian Olympiam. He was designated as the flag bearer for the nation in the opening ceremony. His personal best before the games was 2 hours and 35 minutes in the marathon.

He competed in the men's marathon on 7 August against 27 other competitors. Not even a quarter into the marathon, Villate had fainted and did not complete the race. Despite his performance, he was awarded the IOC Medal of Merit. He was also entered to compete in the men's marathon and men's 10,000 metres at the 1936 Summer Olympics. He later died on 29 December 1946 in Bogotá due to a motorcycle accident. (Note: An article from El Espectador states that it was on 21 December 1946 due to pneumonia.)
