= Turmequé =

Coordinates: 5°19′N 73°30′W

- Municipality and town
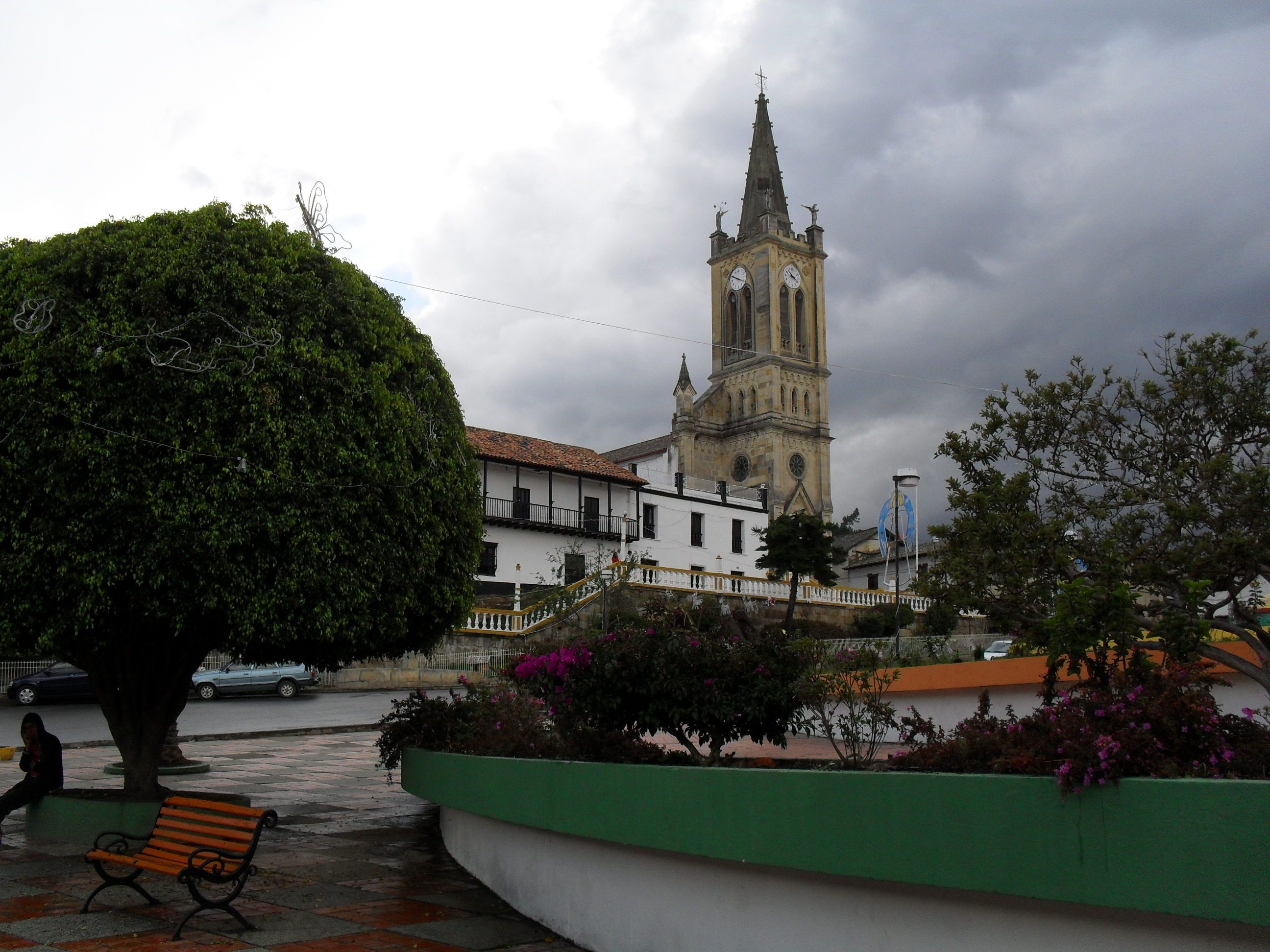
- Catholic church and central square

- Flag

- Location of the municipality and town of Turmequé in the Boyacá Department of Colombia
- Country: Colombia
- Department: Boyacá Department
- Province: Márquez Province
- Founded: 20 July 1537
- Founder: Gonzalo Jiménez de Quesada

Government
  - Mayor: Pedro Antonio Murillo Moreno (2020-2023)

Area
  - Municipality and town: 106 km^{2} (41 sq mi)
  - Urban: 4 km^{2} (1.5 sq mi)
- Elevation: 2,389 m (7,838 ft)

Population
  - Municipality and town: 6,182
  - Density: 58.3/km^{2} (151/sq mi)
  - Urban: 2,565
- Time zone: UTC-5 (Colombia Standard Time)
- Website: Official website

Turmequé is a town and municipality in the Colombian Department of Boyacá, part of the subregion of the Márquez Province. Turmequé is located at 105 kilometres (65 mi) northeast from the capital Bogotá. The municipality borders Ventaquemada in the west, in the east Úmbita, in the north Nuevo Colón and in the south the municipality Villapinzón of the department of Cundinamarca.

== History ==
Turmequé was an important center for the Muisca who inhabited the Altiplano Cundiboyacense before the arrival of the Spanish conquest led by Gonzalo Jiménez de Quesada, who founded modern Turmequé on July 20, 1537 in his search for El Dorado. Turmequé was part of the Muisca Confederation led by the zaque based in Hunza, present-day department capital Tunja. The name of the village is Chibcha and means "vigorous chief". Another name for the town is Valle de las trompetas ("Trumpet Valley") because of the trumpets the Spanish conquistadores were bringing with them. Turmequé has given its name to the Colombian national game of tejo, previously called Turmequé. In the village center a statue honouring the Muisca sports god Chaquén still remembers this.

Before the municipality was split, it used to be extensive in area. In 1773 Villapinzón (then called Hato Viejo) became a separate unity and in 1776 Ventaquemada was separated from Turmequé.

== Economy ==
The town center is for the most part focused on commerce and services while the rural area has agriculture; potatoes, beans, maize, onions, peas, wheat, barley and fruits such as prunes, blackberries, pears and apples and the typical Colombian fruits curuba and feijoa. Livestock farming consists of mainly pork.

== Tourism ==
Being the birthplace of tejo, Turmequé has considerable amount of tourism. Each year the national championships of tejo are held here. The town also has a religious museum.

== Climate ==
Climate data for Turmequé/Nuevo Colón, elevation 2,438 m (7,999 ft), (1981–2010)
Month	Jan	Feb	Mar	Apr	May	Jun	Jul	Aug	Sep	Oct	Nov	Dec	Year
Mean daily maximum °C (°F)	21.9 (71.4)	22.1 (71.8)	21.8 (71.2)	20.6 (69.1)	19.7 (67.5)	18.0 (64.4)	17.2 (63.0)	17.5 (63.5)	18.8 (65.8)	19.8 (67.6)	20.5 (68.9)	20.9 (69.6)	19.9 (67.8)
Daily mean °C (°F)	14.7 (58.5)	14.8 (58.6)	15.1 (59.2)	15.0 (59.0)	14.6 (58.3)	13.9 (57.0)	13.3 (55.9)	13.4 (56.1)	13.9 (57.0)	14.4 (57.9)	14.7 (58.5)	14.6 (58.3)	14.4 (57.9)
Mean daily minimum °C (°F)	9.1 (48.4)	9.7 (49.5)	10.3 (50.5)	10.9 (51.6)	11.0 (51.8)	10.5 (50.9)	10.0 (50.0)	9.9 (49.8)	9.5 (49.1)	10.0 (50.0)	10.3 (50.5)	9.6 (49.3)	10.1 (50.2)
Average precipitation mm (inches)	16.1 (0.63)	28.6 (1.13)	54.1 (2.13)	84.0 (3.31)	108.7 (4.28)	115.3 (4.54)	124.3 (4.89)	102.8 (4.05)	76.1 (3.00)	96.3 (3.79)	71.6 (2.82)	31.0 (1.22)	908.7 (35.78)
Average precipitation days (≥ 1.0 mm)	6	9	12	18	24	24	26	25	20	20	17	10	208
Average relative humidity (%)	79	79	79	82	85	87	88	88	85	84	83	81	83
Mean monthly sunshine hours	195.3	158.1	151.9	111.0	105.4	87.0	89.9	99.2	126.0	136.4	150.0	186.0	1,596.2
Mean daily sunshine hours	6.3	5.6	4.9	3.7	3.4	2.9	2.9	3.2	4.2	4.4	5.0	6.0	4.4
Source: Instituto de Hidrologia Meteorologia y Estudios Ambientales

== Gallery ==
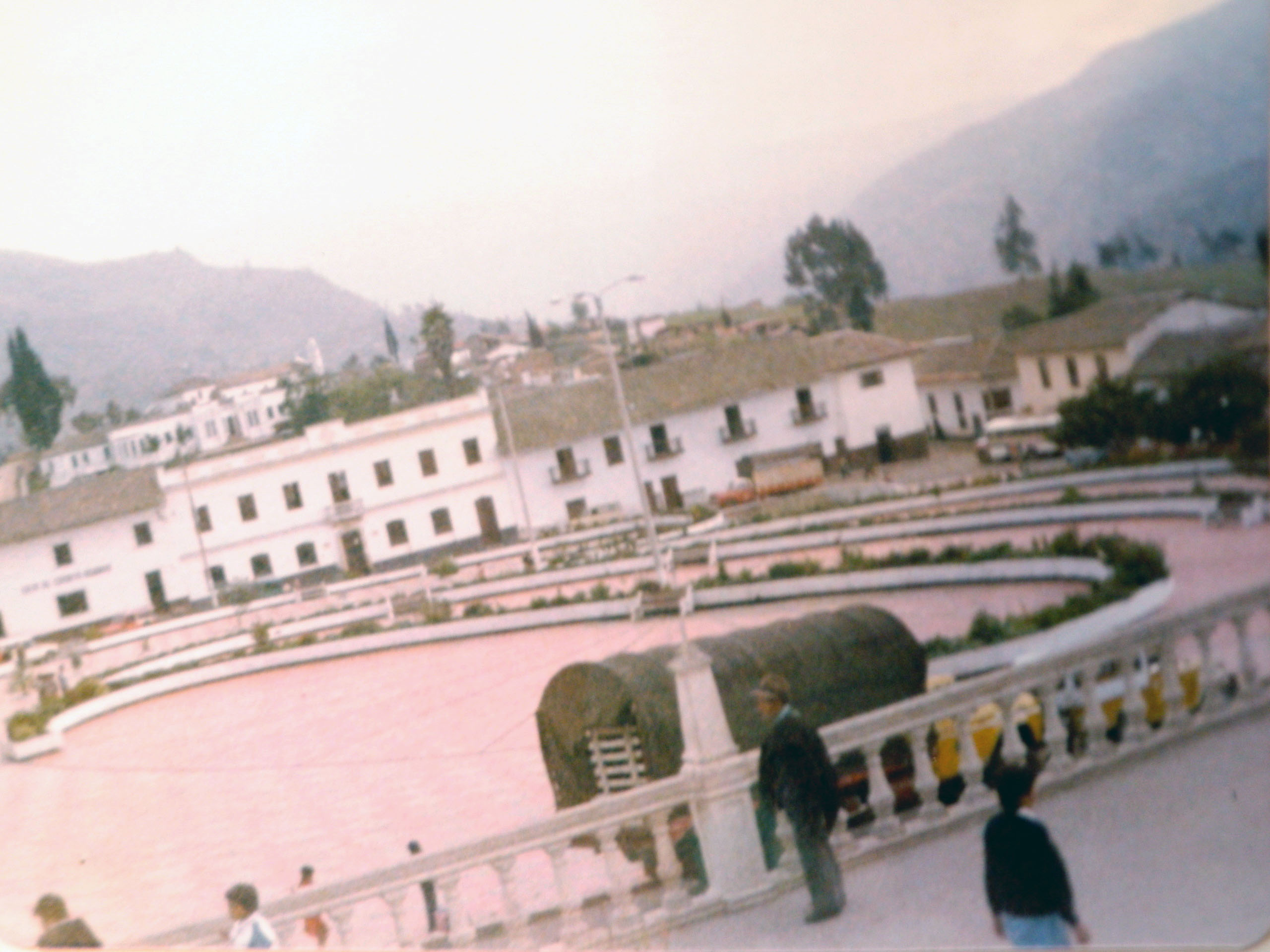
Central square

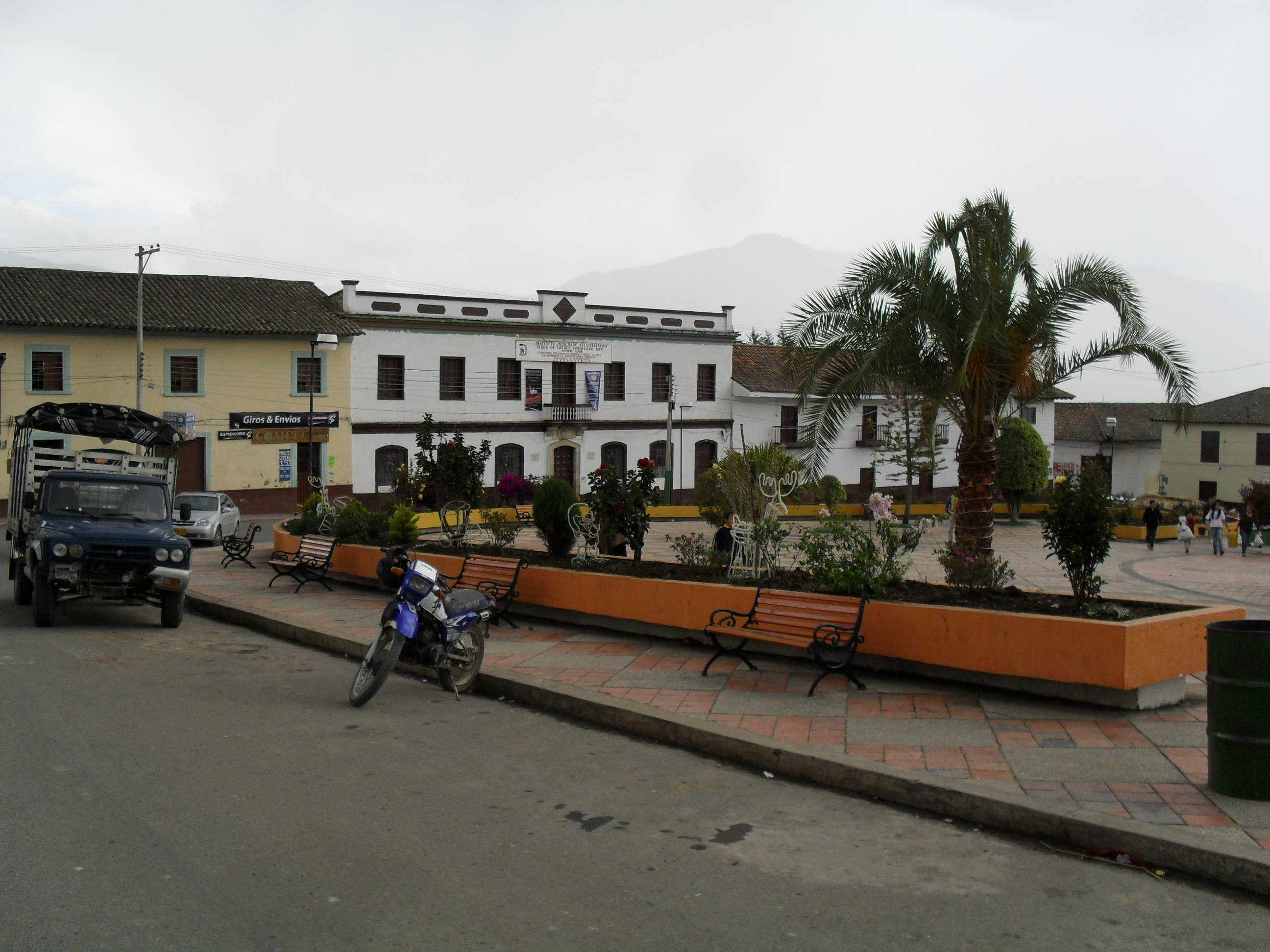
Square

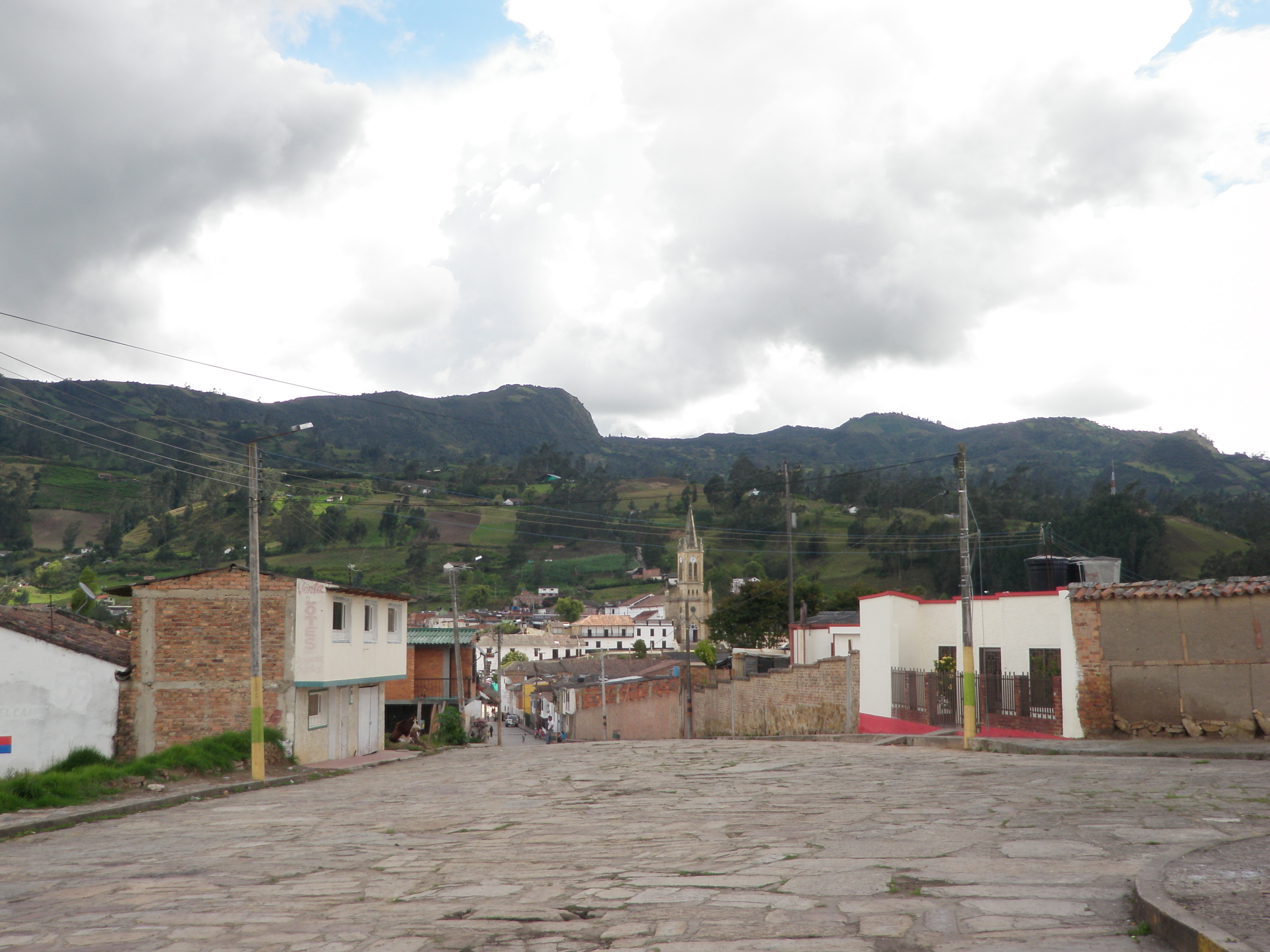
Street view

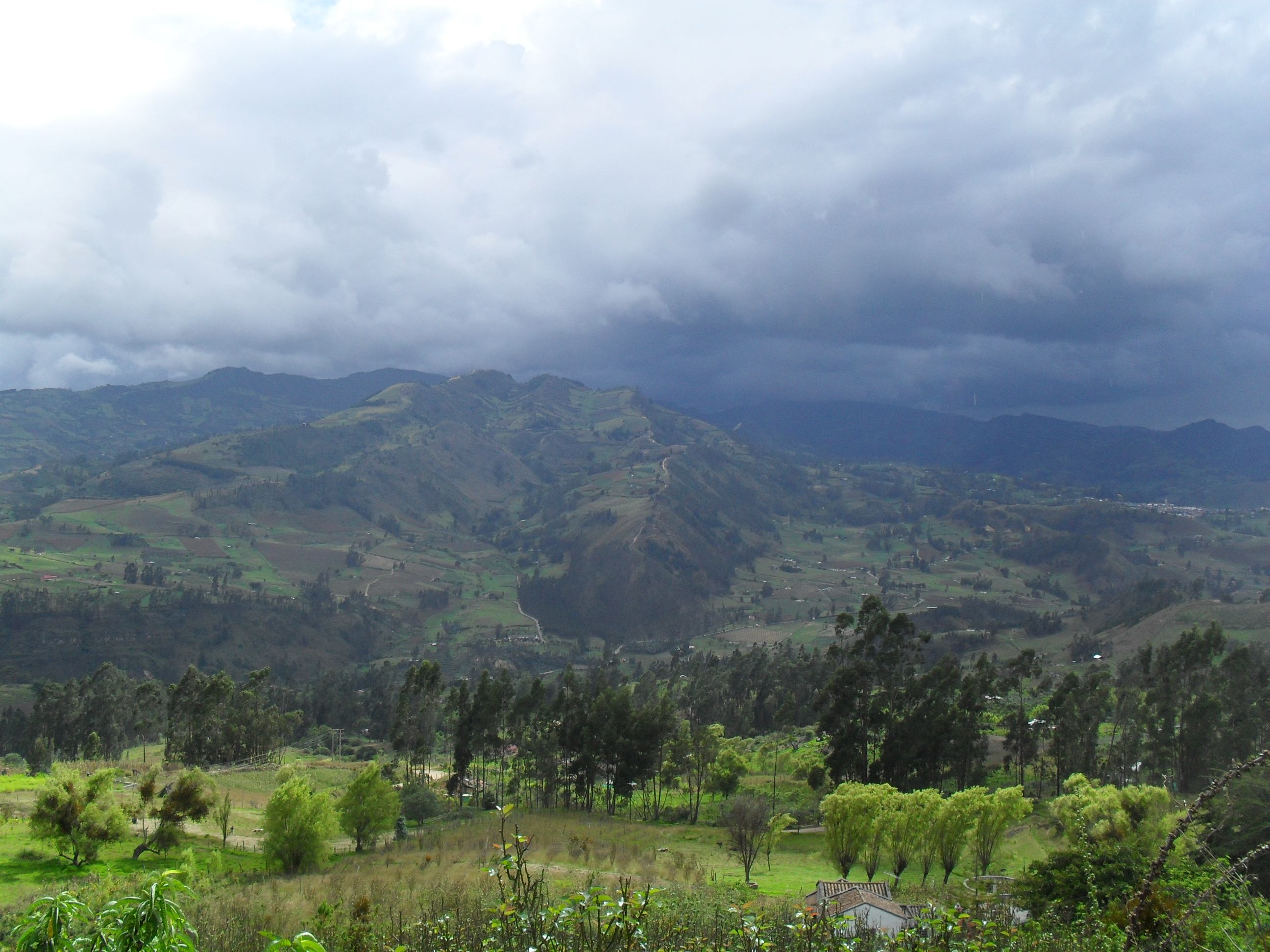
View of Turmequé

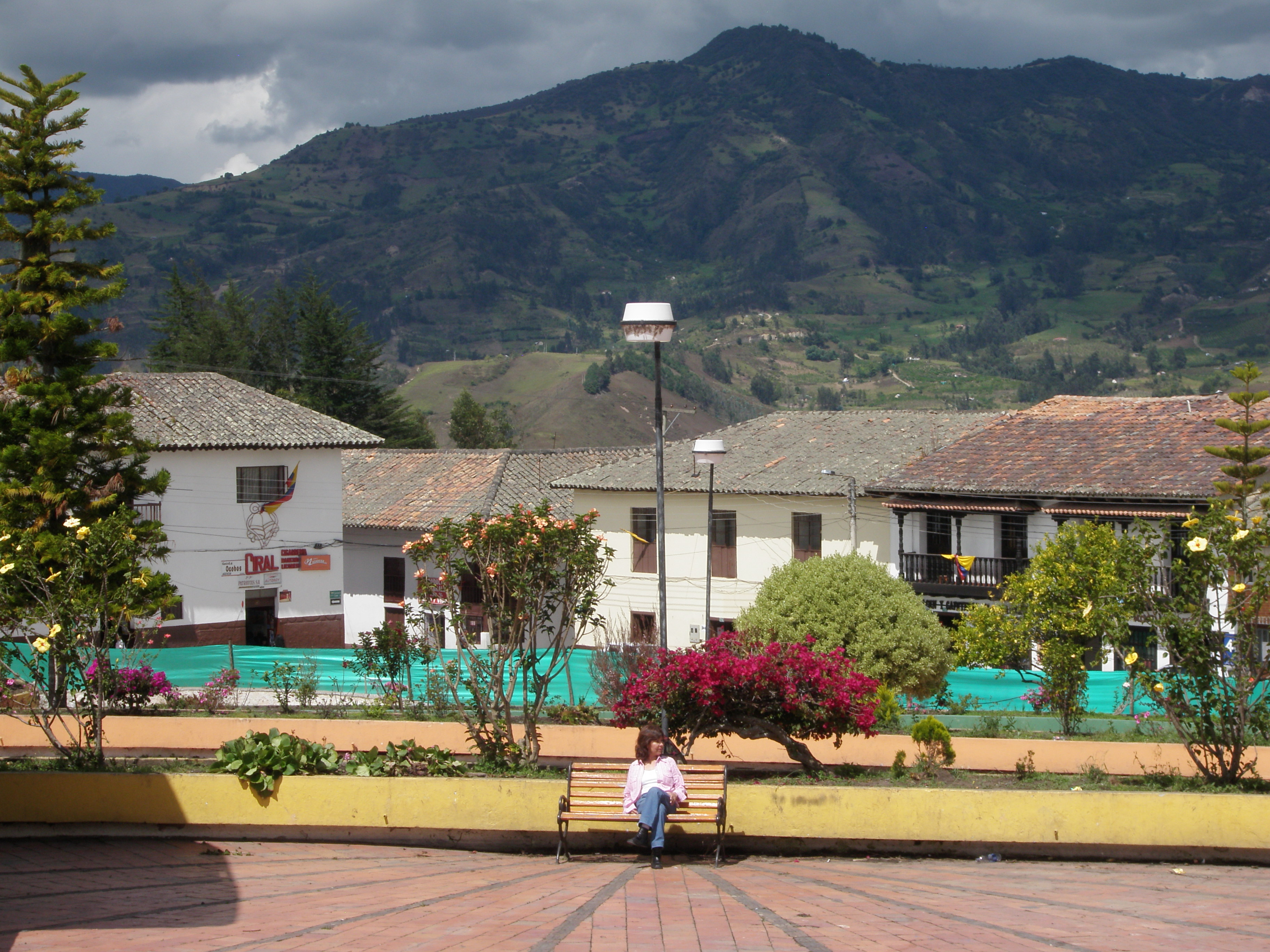
Turmequé with Cordillera Oriental in the background
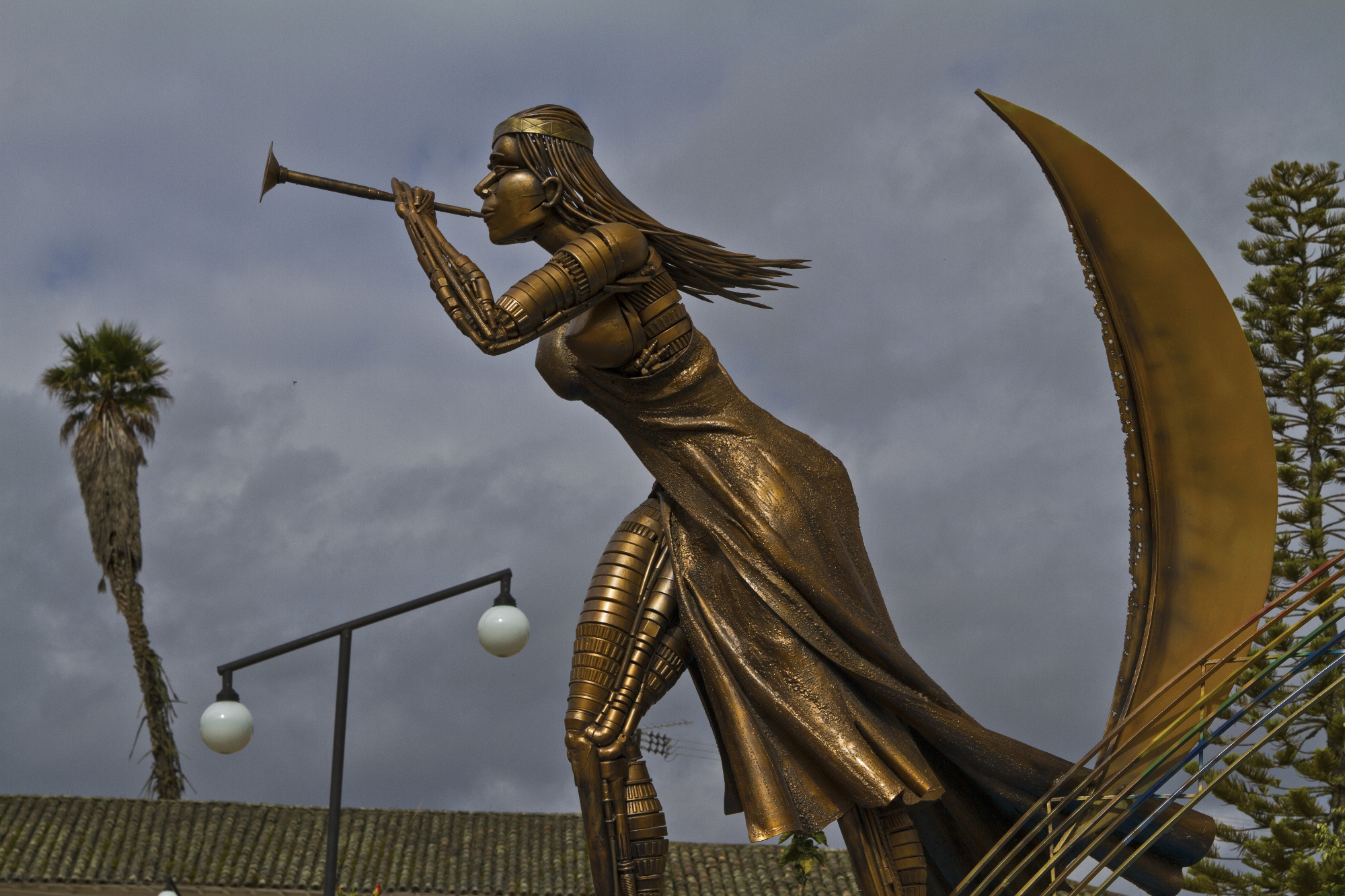
Monument honouring the indigenous Muisca

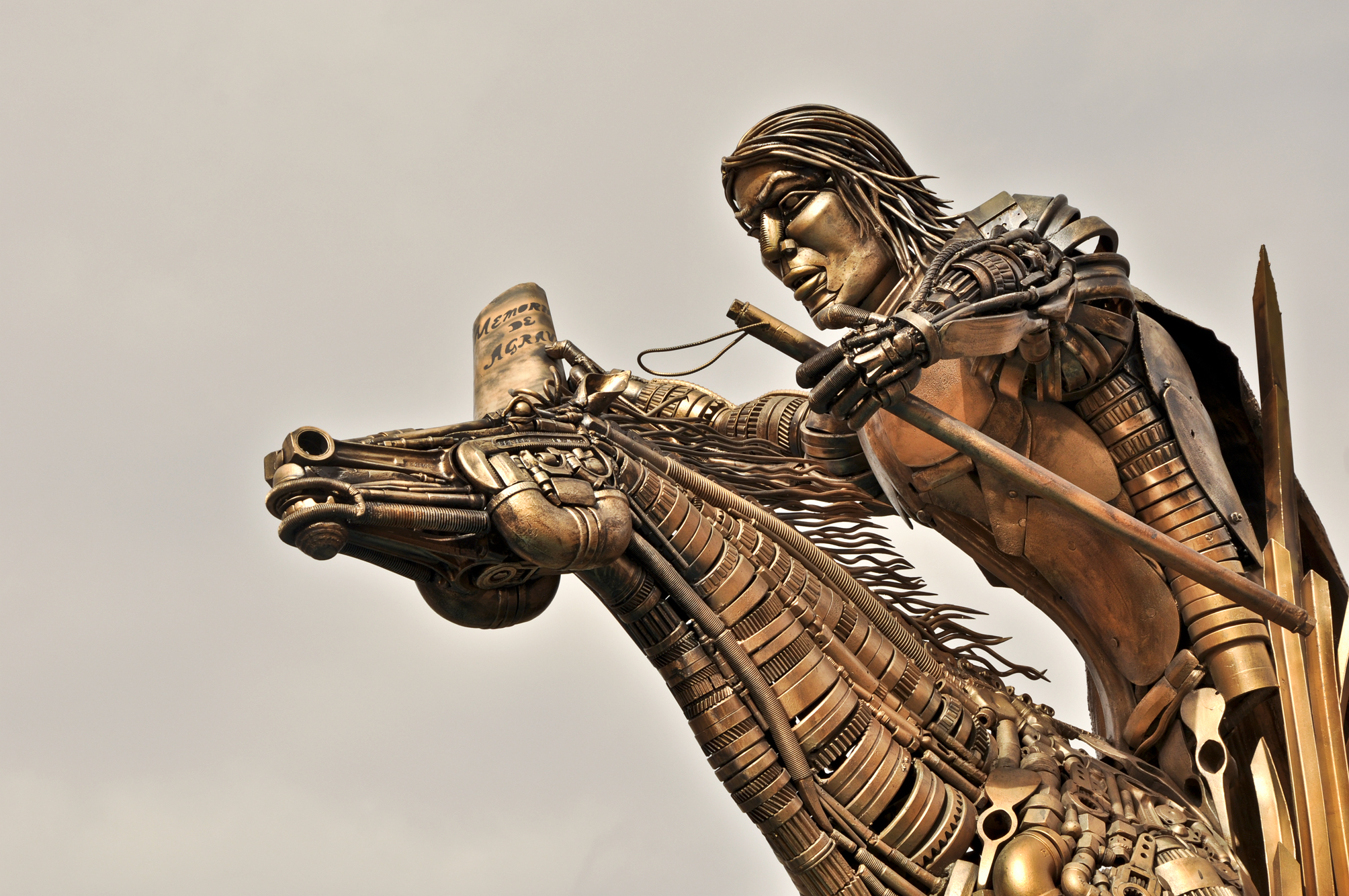
Muisca monument at the central square

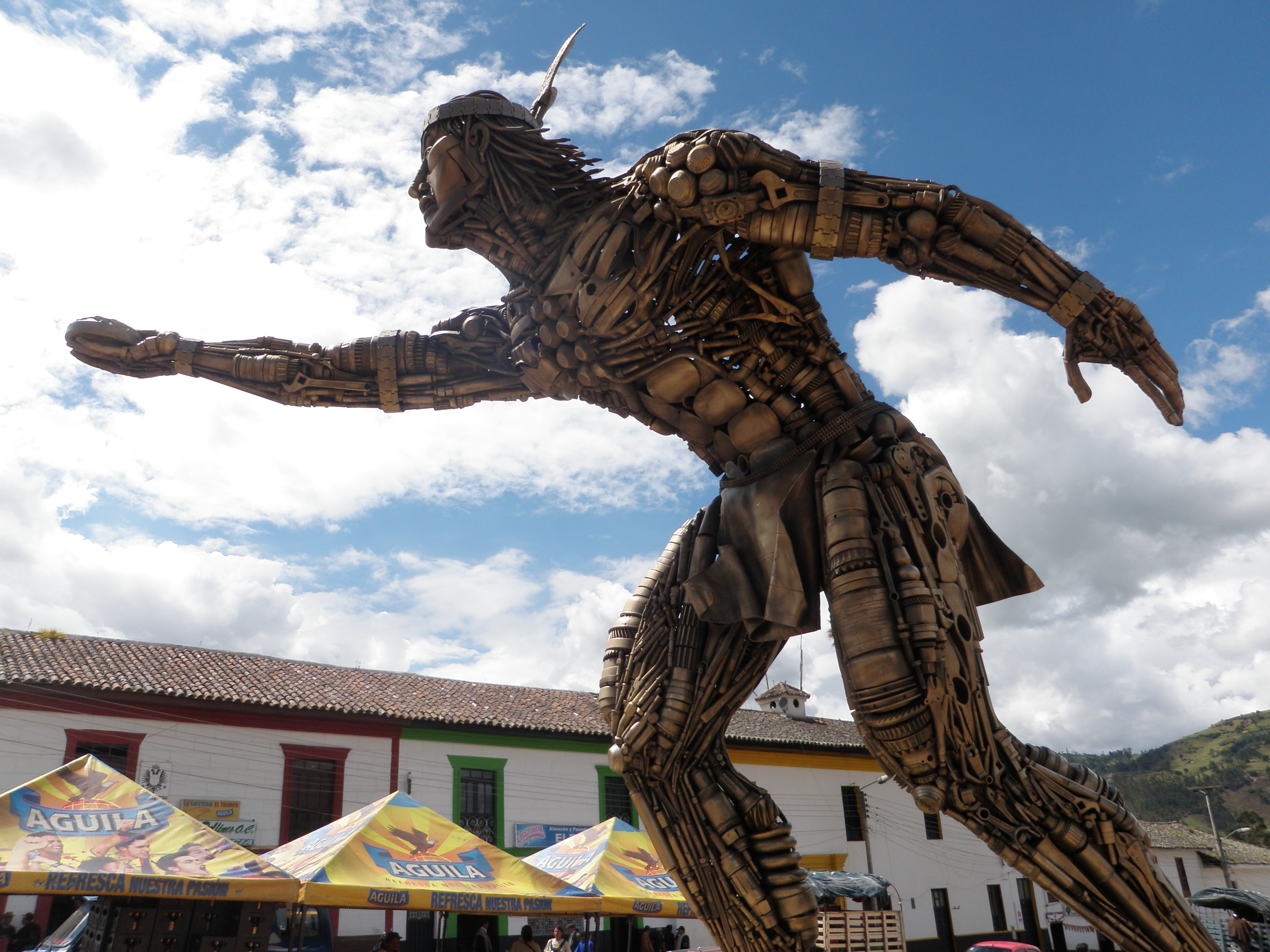
Monument to god Chaquén and tejo

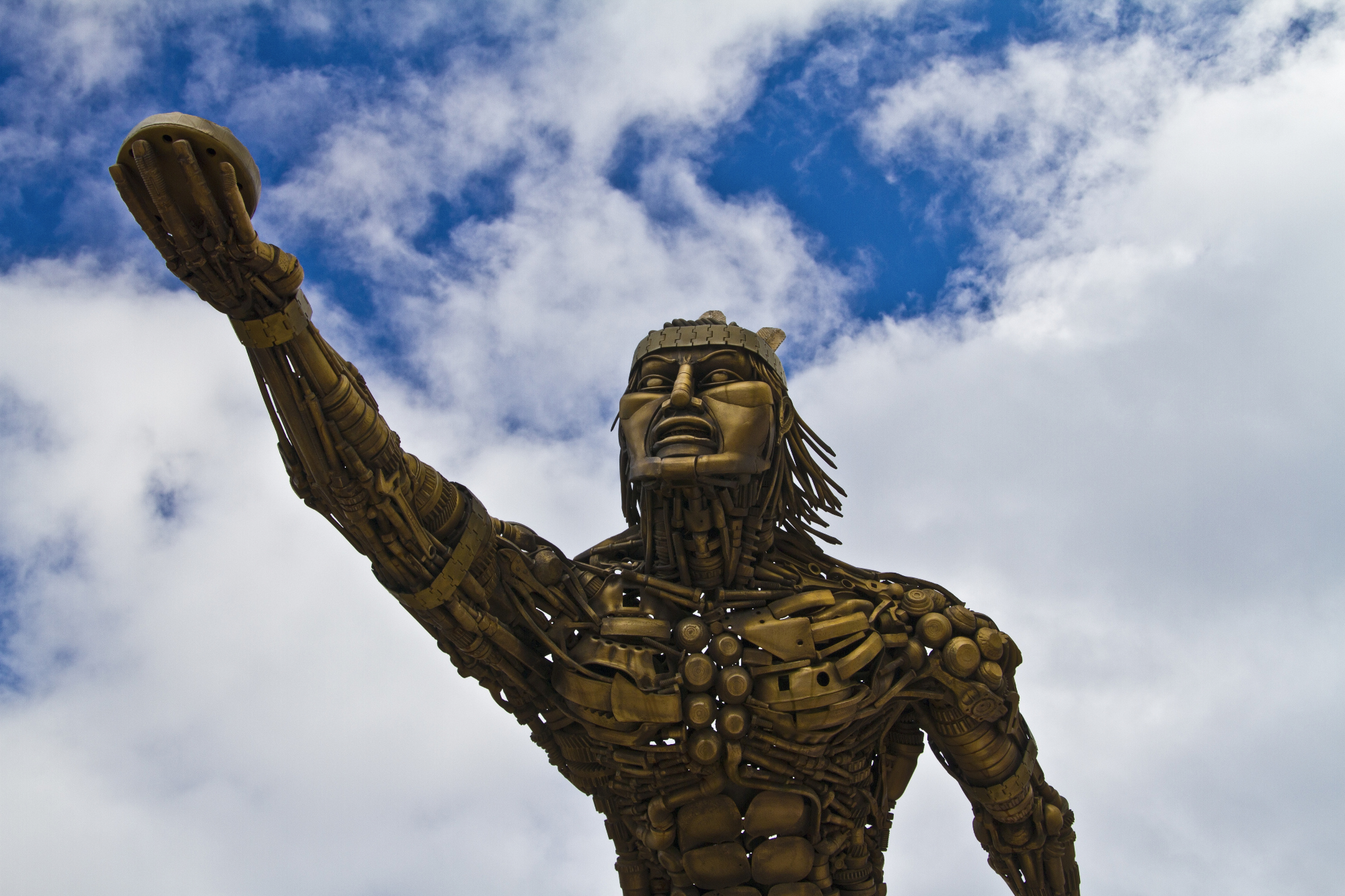
Monument

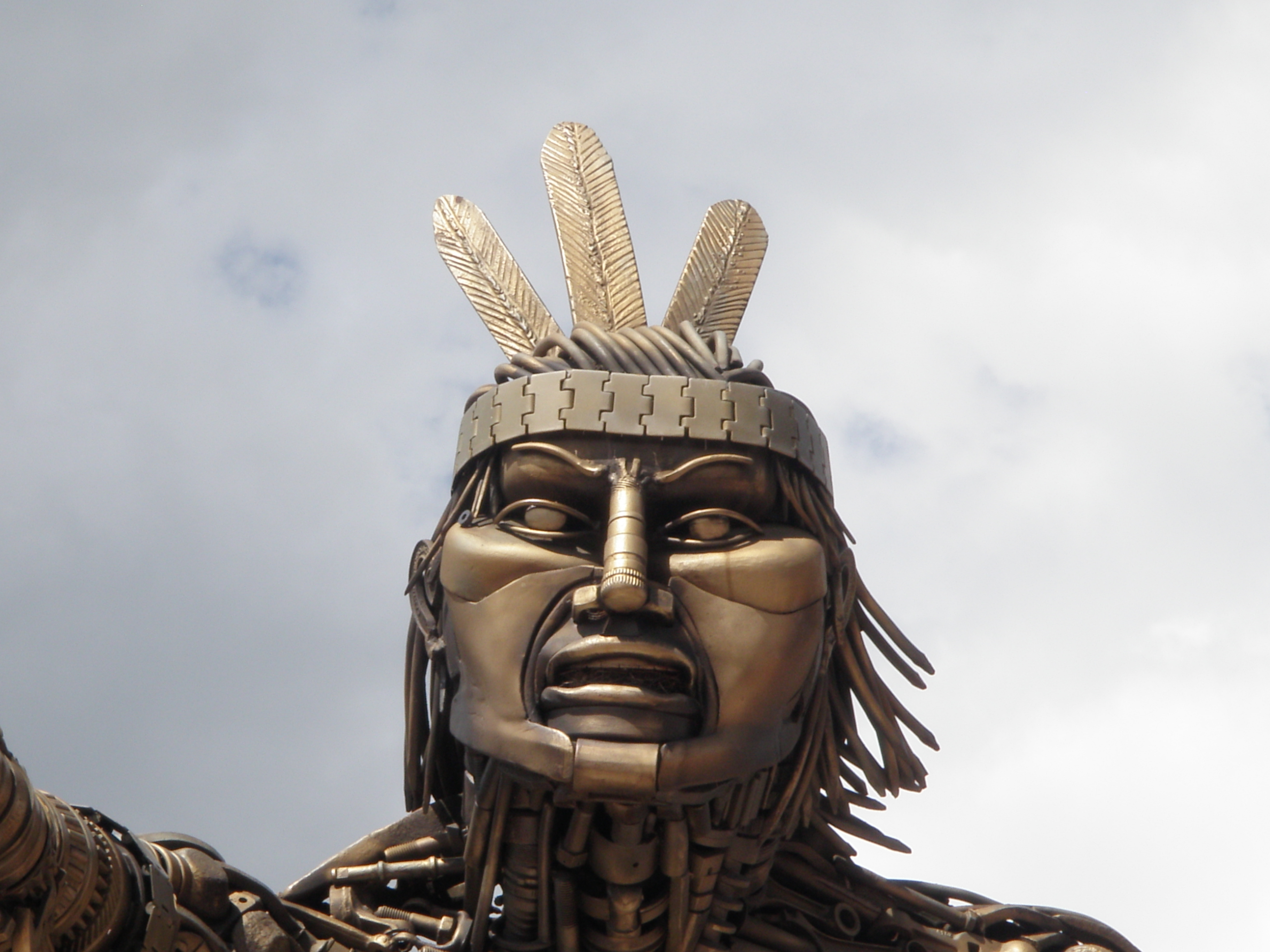
Head of the statue

== See also ==
- Chaquén - god of sports, tejo
- Diego de Torres y Moyachoque - mestizo cacique of Turmequé
