= Chaquén =

God of sports and fertility in the Muisca religion of South America

- Sports, fertility
- Member of Muisca religion
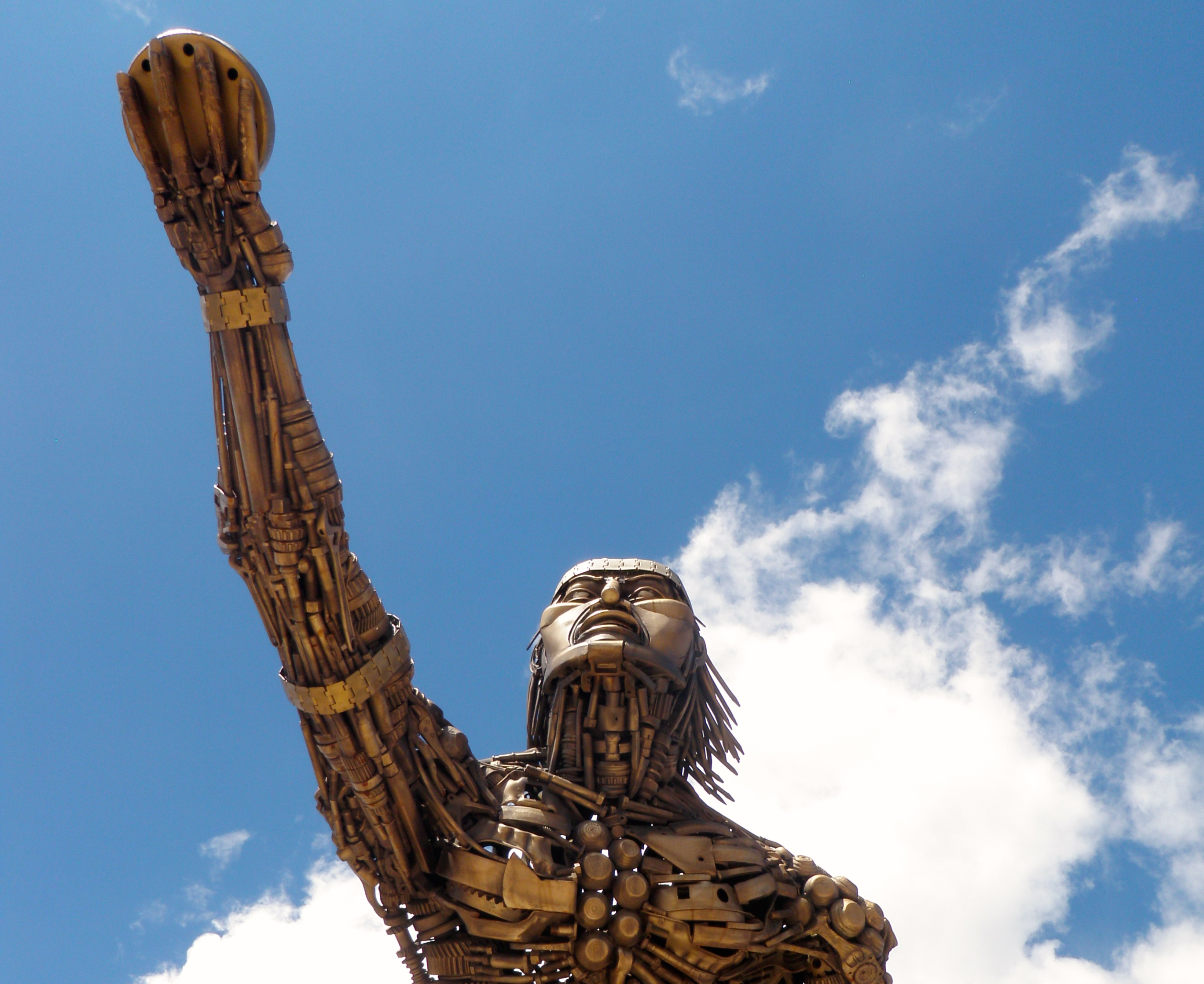
- Turmequé, cacique patron of tejo national sport of Colombia, already played in Muisca times
- Region: Altiplano Cundiboyacense
- Ethnic group: Muisca
- Festivals: Sowing and harvest

Chaquén was the god of sports and fertility in the religion of the Muisca. The Muisca and their confederation were one of the four advanced civilizations of the Americas and as they were warriors, sports was very important to train the fighters for wars, mainly fought between the zipazgo and the zacazgo but also against other indigenous peoples as the Panches, Muzos and others. When the Spanish arrived in the highlands of central Colombia, the Altiplano Cundiboyacense, they encountered resistance of the guecha warriors, trained by Chaquén.

== Description ==
Chaquén flew over the boundaries of the sowing fields of the rich agriculture of the Muisca. During the contests and festivities of the Muisca people Chaquén manifestated himself. 17th century chronicler Pedro Simón said about Chaquén: "The Muisca organized races on their holidays where the vassals of the caciques would compete in many aspects; dances with new inventions and a lot of feathers, flutes, horns and drums. The people would have interludes with delights, wearing uniforms and many of them wore animal skins with diadems of fine gold. As prizes for the winners there were richly decorated mantles and the festivities were celebrated with a lot of chicha".

During the first months of the year, the people celebrated their agricultural festivities around the edges of their crop fields honouring Chaquén to ensure a good harvest. With playing flutes and horns the men would dance holding hands with the women and sang both happy and sad songs. They held the earthenware bowls filled with chicha in their hands. The festivities not only served to get good harvest, as well to gain partners; men and women, all drunk would find each other at these celebrations and the caciques and other nobles gained their women here".

The honouring of Chaquén was a celebration of fertility, not only for the agriculture, but also for the people. Sexual rites were encompassed with many feathers and costumes also used in the warfare of the Muisca.

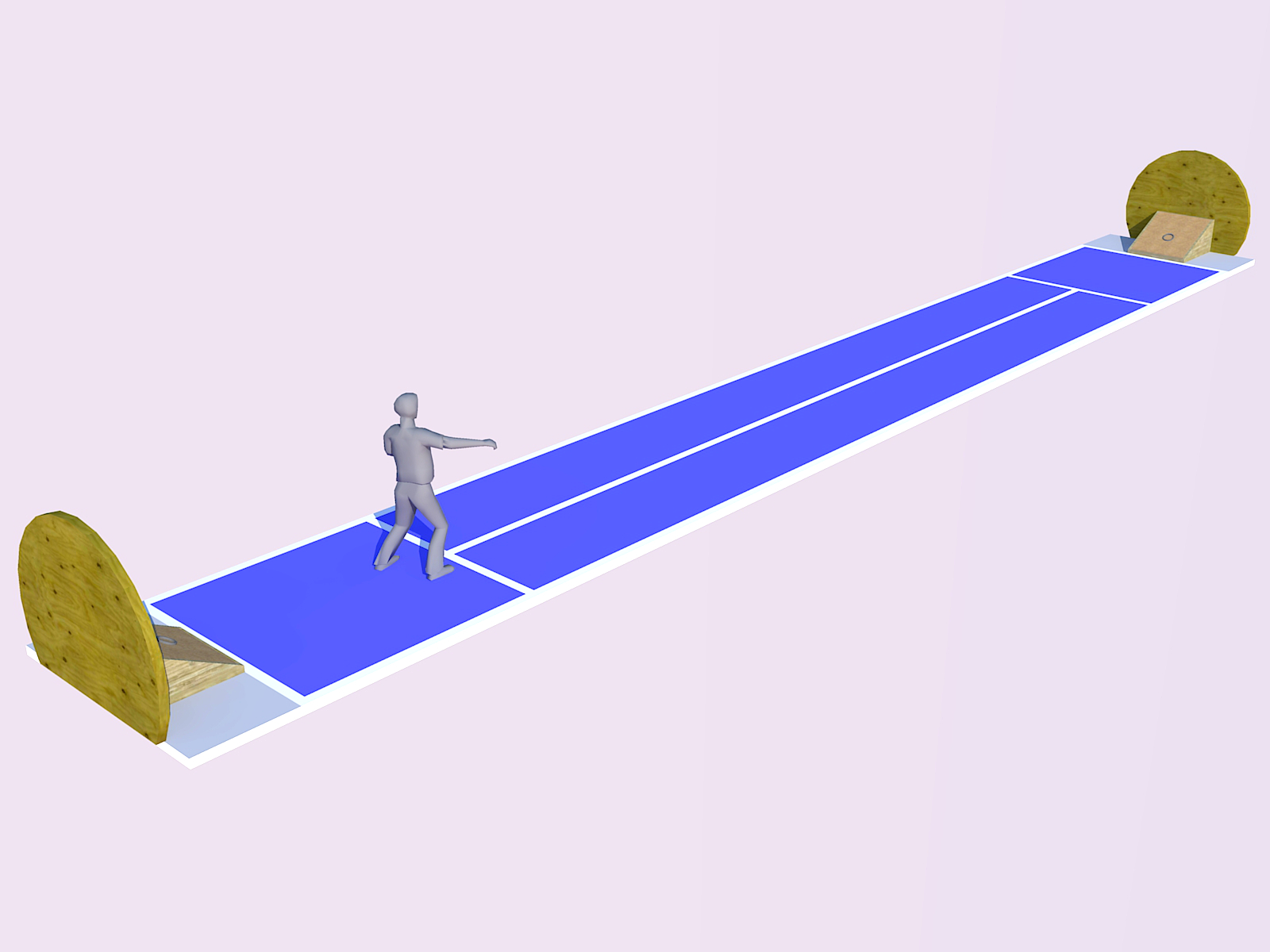
The game of tejo national sport of Colombia

=== Chaquén punishing Tintoa and Sunuba ===
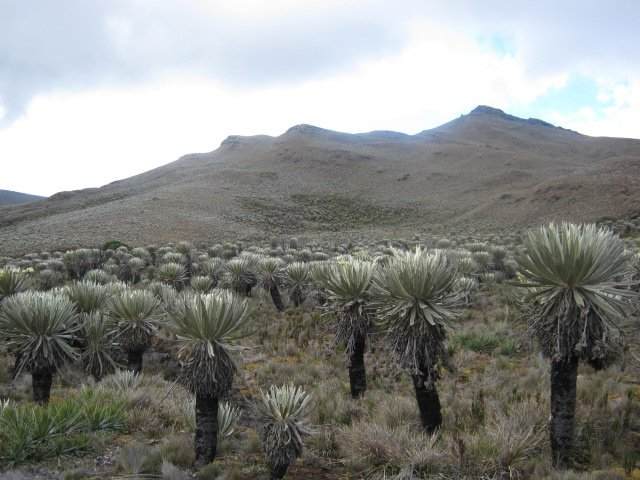
Dry plains (páramo) in the highlands
punishment of Tintoa

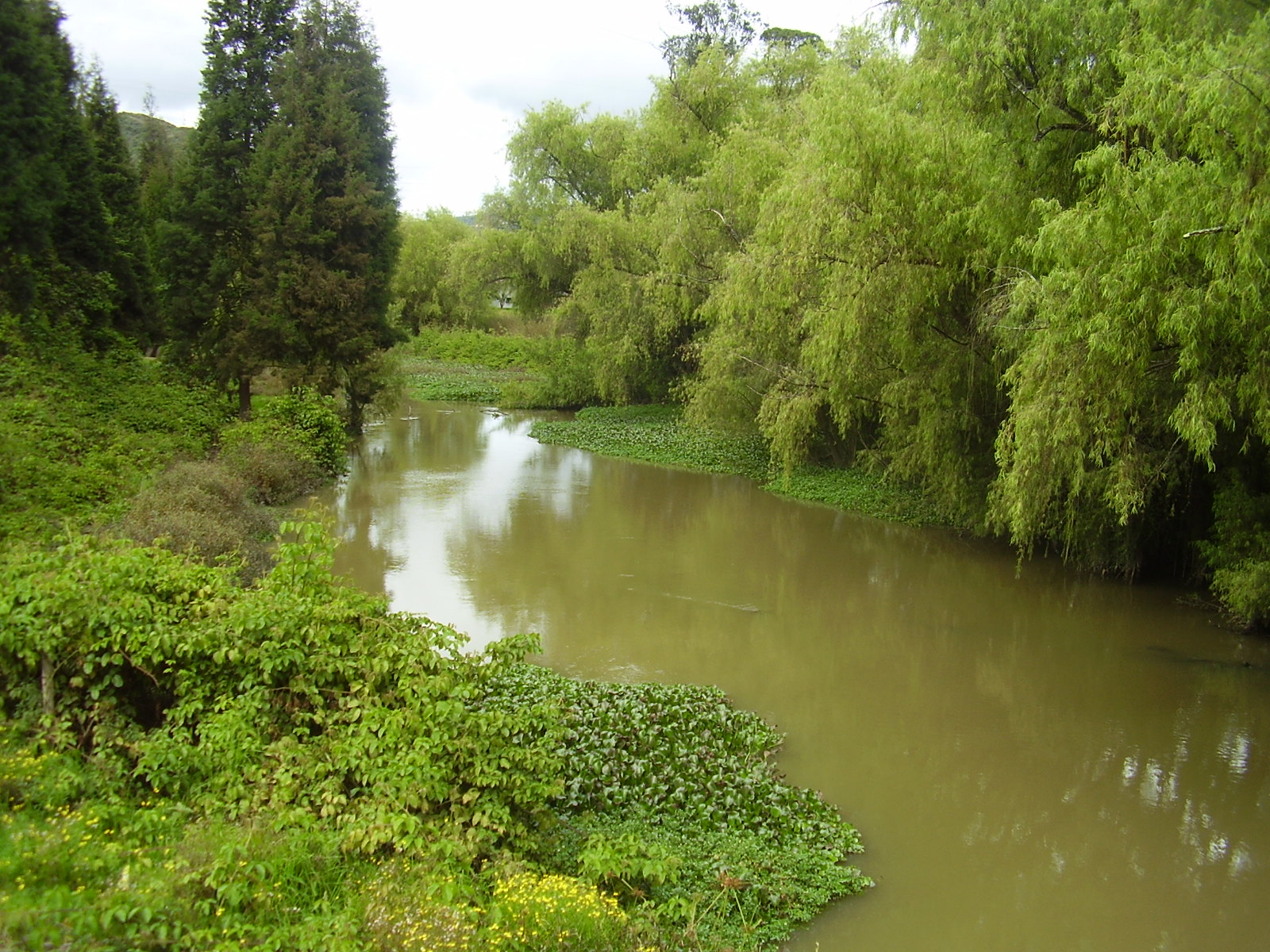
Wet reeds around the Bogotá River
condemnation of Sunuba

Chaquén not only was the god of sports and fertility, he also made sure those who committed adultery were punished, like happened to Tintoa and Sunuba. The young and brave guecha warrior Tintoa fell in love with the beautiful Sunuba, principal wife – the Muisca had extensive polygamy – of a prince. When the husband of Sunuba went to war, he named his wife as guardian. When the warrior prince returned from battle and found out about his wife cheating with Tintoa, he decided to punish them both. The lovers ran away and escaped the law. When Chaquén found out where they were located, he punished them converting them into vegetables; the beautiful Sunuba into a type of cane or reed, condemned to live close to the waters of the various swamps of the Bogotá savanna and Tintoa into a dry weed, growing only in arid areas, separating the two forever.

=== Heritage of Chaquén ===
In Boyacá and other parts of central Colombia the game of tejo survived from Muisca times. The goal of tejo is to throw clay dishes and hit pieces of small explosive, gaining points. This game has been played before the arrival of the Spanish conquistadores and is still very popular in the villages of the Altiplano Cundiboyacense.

Honouring Chaquén a theme park in Sumapaz, Bogotá has been named after him.

== See also ==
- Turmequé
