= Nuevo Colón =

Nuevo Colón Chiriví
- Municipality and town
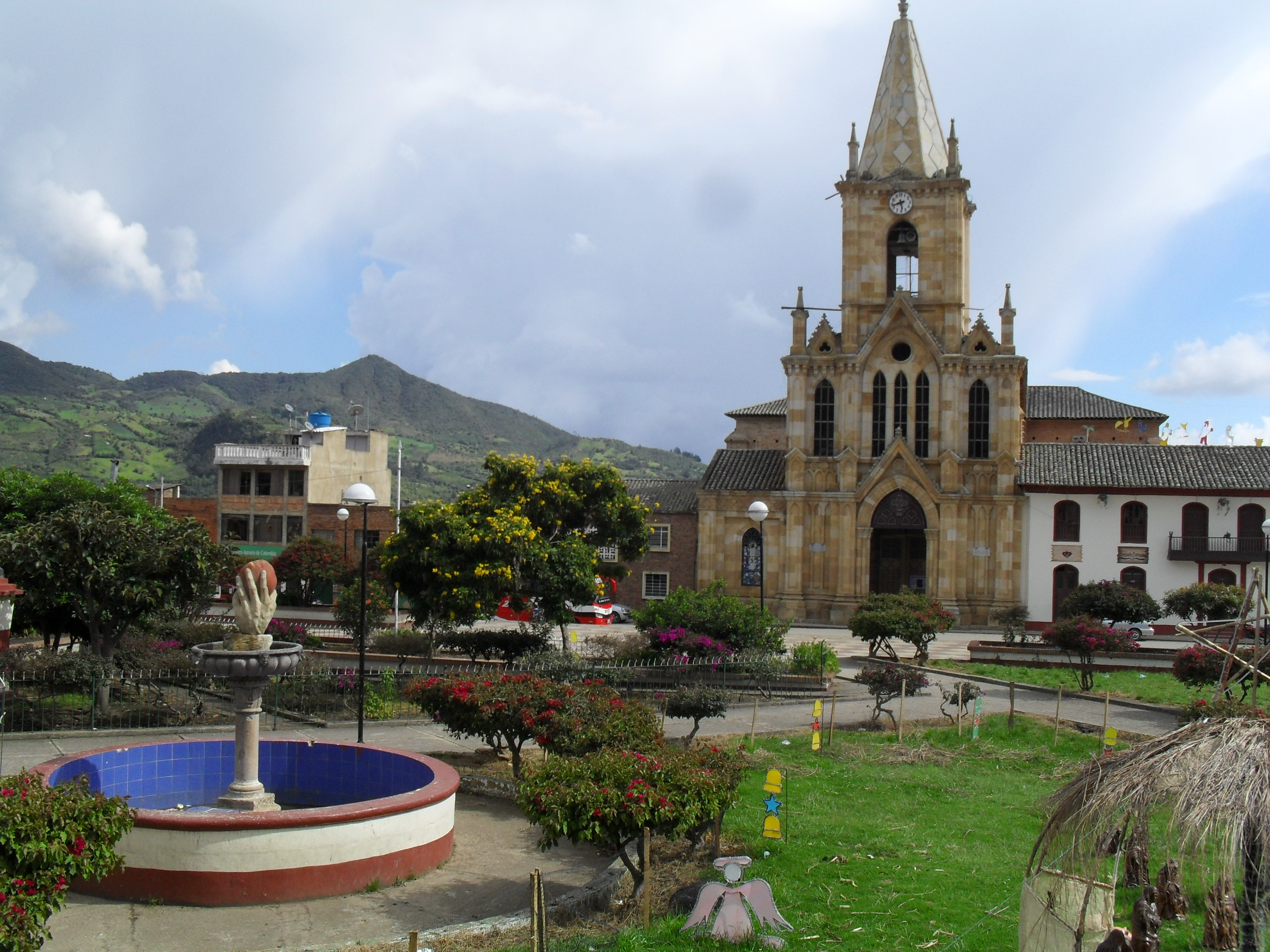
- Central square of Nuevo Colón

- Flag Coat of arms

- Location of the municipality and town of Nuevo Colón in the Boyacá Department of Colombia
- Coordinates: 5°21′N 73°28′W
- Country: Colombia
- Department: Boyacá Department
- Province: Márquez Province
- Founded: 15 October 1783

Government
  - Mayor: Héctor Wilson Castelblanco Rodríguez (2020-2023)

Area
  - Municipality and town: 0.28582 km^{2} (0.11036 sq mi)
  - Urban: 0.04492 km^{2} (0.01734 sq mi)

Population (2015)
  - Municipality and town: 6,559
  - Urban: 1,300
- Time zone: UTC-5 (Colombia Standard Time)
- Website: Official website

Nuevo Colón is a town and municipality in the Colombian Department of Boyacá, part of the subregion of the Márquez Province. The urban centre is located at an altitude of 2,500 metres (8,200 ft) on the Altiplano Cundiboyacense, at a distance of 34 kilometres (21 mi) from the departmental capital Tunja. Nuevo Colón borders Boyacá, Boyacá, Ventaquemada and Jenesano in the north, Tibaná and Turmequé in the south, Tibaná in the east and Turmequé and Ventaquemada in the west.

== Etymology ==
Nuevo Colón was first called Chiriví, after the name of the area in the time before the Spanish conquest, when it was inhabited by the Chibcha-speaking Muisca. Chiriví means "our". It received the name Nuevo Colón in 1907.

== History ==
Chiriví was part of the domains of the hoa of Hunza before the conquest. Conquistador Gonzalo Jiménez de Quesada passed through Nuevo Colón in 1537, when he was crossing the Tenza Valley to discover the emerald mines of Somondoco, on his way to Hunza. Chiriví, as Nuevo Colón was called, after the foundation of Tunja, became part of the encomienda of Gonzalo Suárez Rendón. Nuevo Colón was visited by the first evangelisers in 1556, the first church was constructed in 1776 and modern Nuevo Colón was founded on October 15, 1783. The colour orange in the coat of arms of the municipality refers to the skin colour of the indigenous Muisca.

== Climate ==
Nuevo Colón has a subtropical highland climate (Köppen: Cfb) with mild temperatures. April to November are cool, with frequent precipitation, while December to March are warmer and drier.

Climate data for Nuevo Colón, elevation 2,438 m (7,999 ft), (1981–2010)
Month	Jan	Feb	Mar	Apr	May	Jun	Jul	Aug	Sep	Oct	Nov	Dec	Year
Mean daily maximum °C (°F)	21.9 (71.4)	22.1 (71.8)	21.8 (71.2)	20.6 (69.1)	19.7 (67.5)	18.0 (64.4)	17.2 (63.0)	17.5 (63.5)	18.8 (65.8)	19.8 (67.6)	20.5 (68.9)	20.9 (69.6)	19.9 (67.8)
Daily mean °C (°F)	14.7 (58.5)	14.8 (58.6)	15.1 (59.2)	15.0 (59.0)	14.6 (58.3)	13.9 (57.0)	13.3 (55.9)	13.4 (56.1)	13.9 (57.0)	14.4 (57.9)	14.7 (58.5)	14.6 (58.3)	14.4 (57.9)
Mean daily minimum °C (°F)	9.1 (48.4)	9.7 (49.5)	10.3 (50.5)	10.9 (51.6)	11.0 (51.8)	10.5 (50.9)	10.0 (50.0)	9.9 (49.8)	9.5 (49.1)	10.0 (50.0)	10.3 (50.5)	9.6 (49.3)	10.1 (50.2)
Average precipitation mm (inches)	16.1 (0.63)	28.6 (1.13)	54.1 (2.13)	84.0 (3.31)	108.7 (4.28)	115.3 (4.54)	124.3 (4.89)	102.8 (4.05)	76.1 (3.00)	96.3 (3.79)	71.6 (2.82)	31.0 (1.22)	908.7 (35.78)
Average precipitation days (≥ 1.0 mm)	6	9	12	18	24	24	26	25	20	20	17	10	208
Average relative humidity (%)	79	79	79	82	85	87	88	88	85	84	83	81	83
Mean monthly sunshine hours	195.3	158.1	151.9	111.0	105.4	87.0	89.9	99.2	126.0	136.4	150.0	186.0	1,596.2
Mean daily sunshine hours	6.3	5.6	4.9	3.7	3.4	2.9	2.9	3.2	4.2	4.4	5.0	6.0	4.4
Source: Instituto de Hidrologia Meteorologia y Estudios Ambientales

== Economy ==
Around 80% of the economy of Nuevo Colón is based on agriculture of fruits. Main products cultivated are prunes, pears, apples, peaches, and the typical Colombian fruits curuba, tree tomato, papayuela, feijoa, granadilla and uchuva. Additionally potatoes, beans and maize are grown.

== Gallery ==
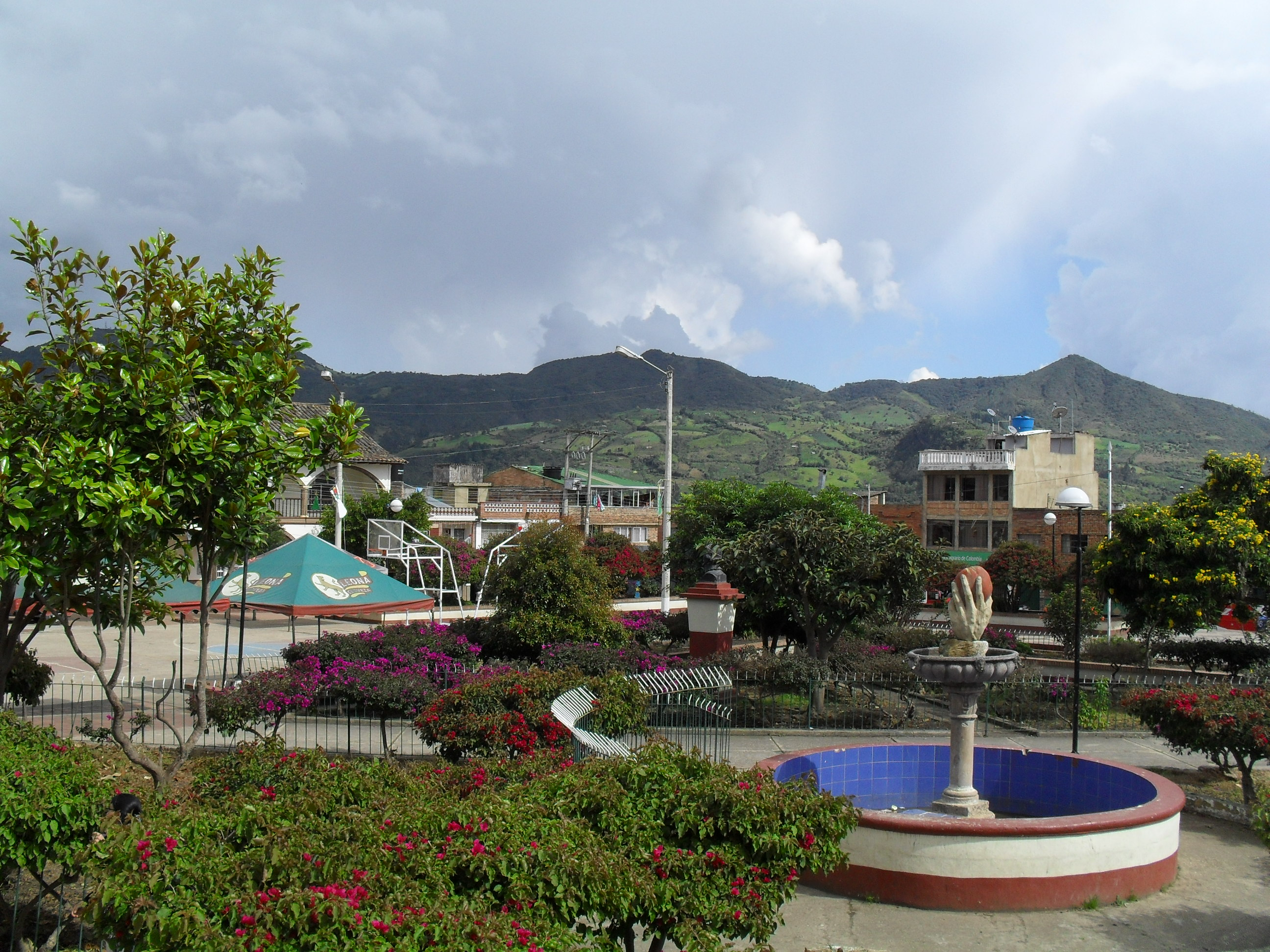
Central square

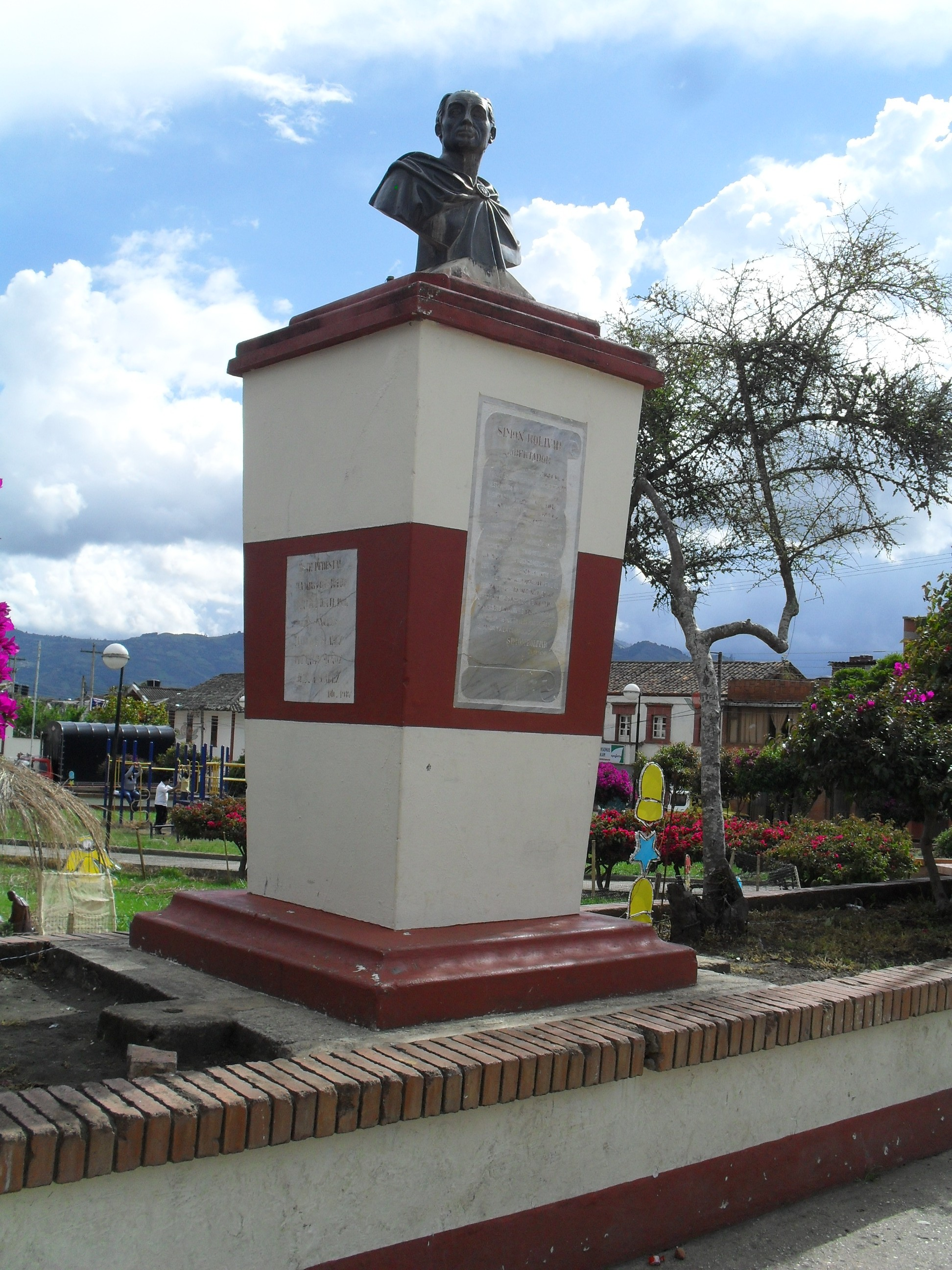
Bust of Simón Bolívar

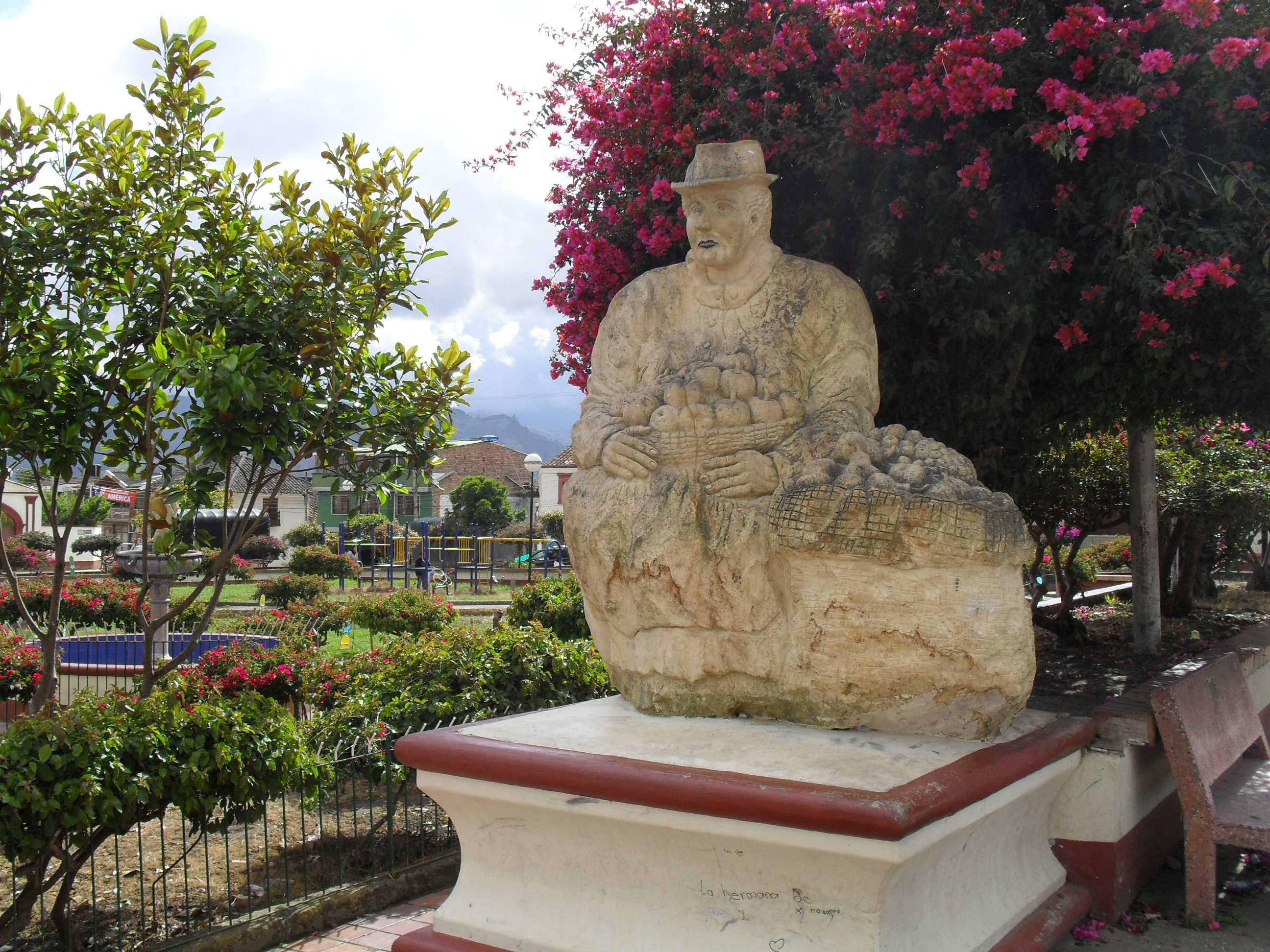
Monument to the farmer

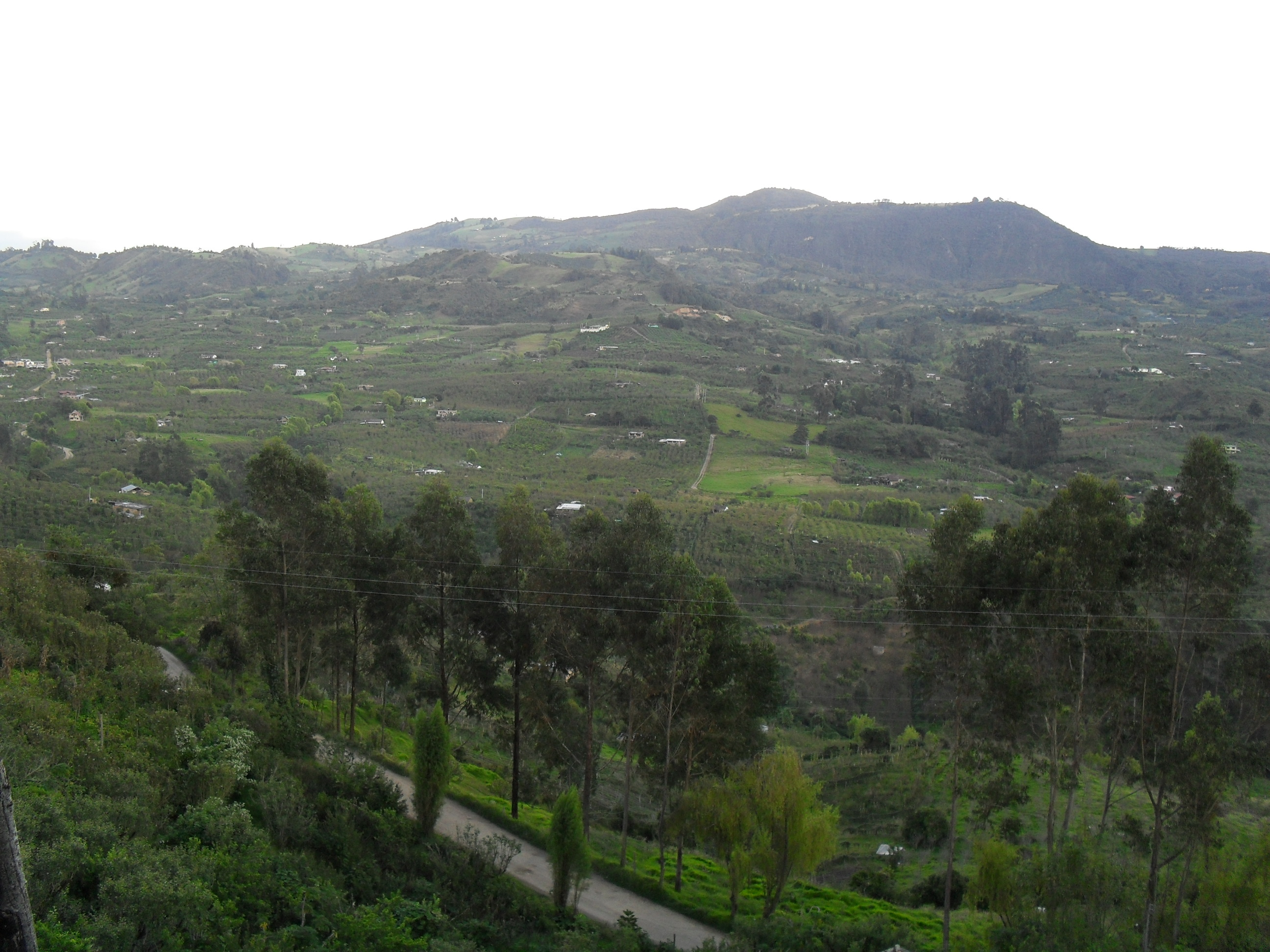
Fruit cultivation

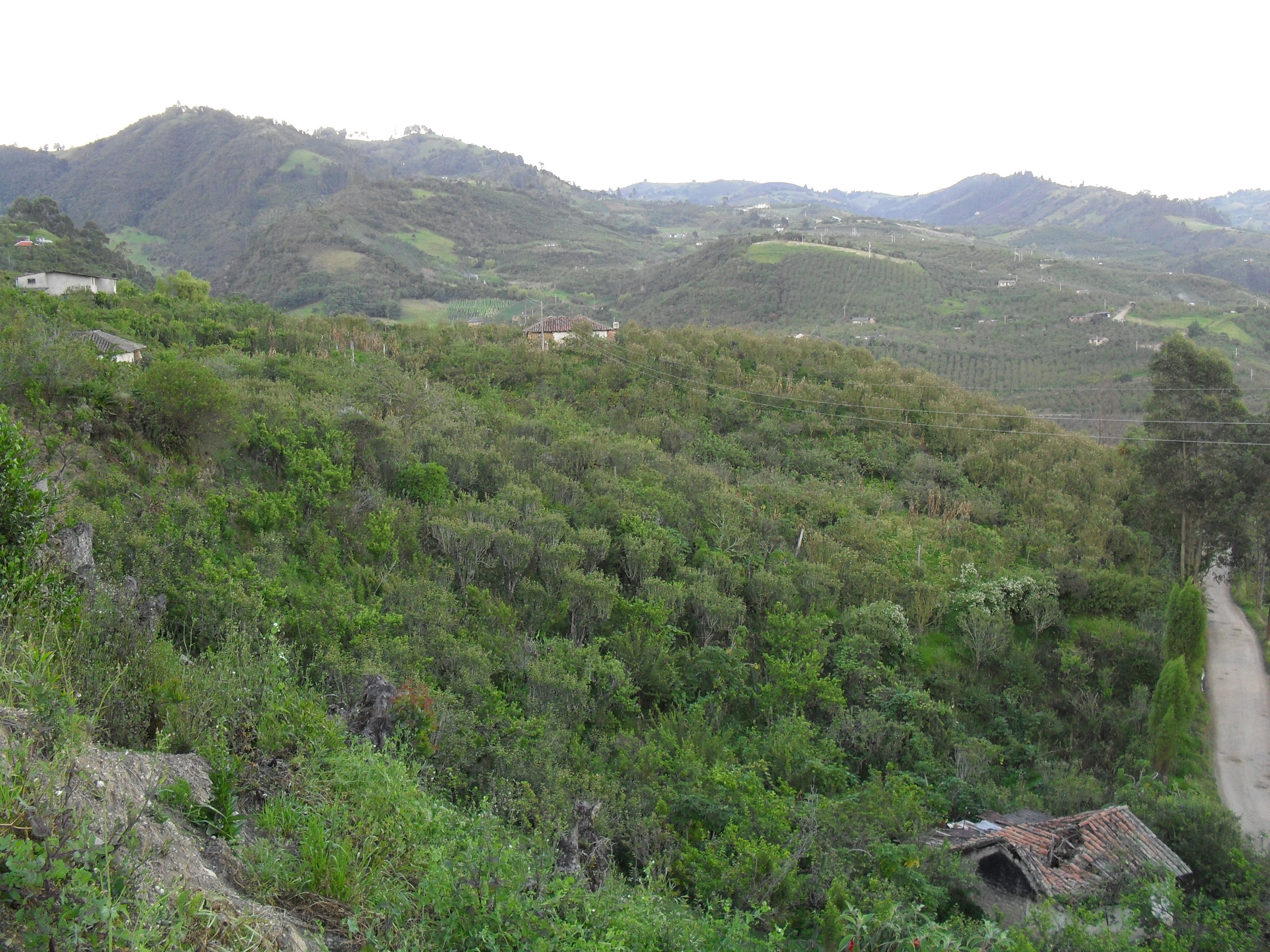
Fruit cultivation
