= Tejo (sport) =

Traditional sport in Colombia

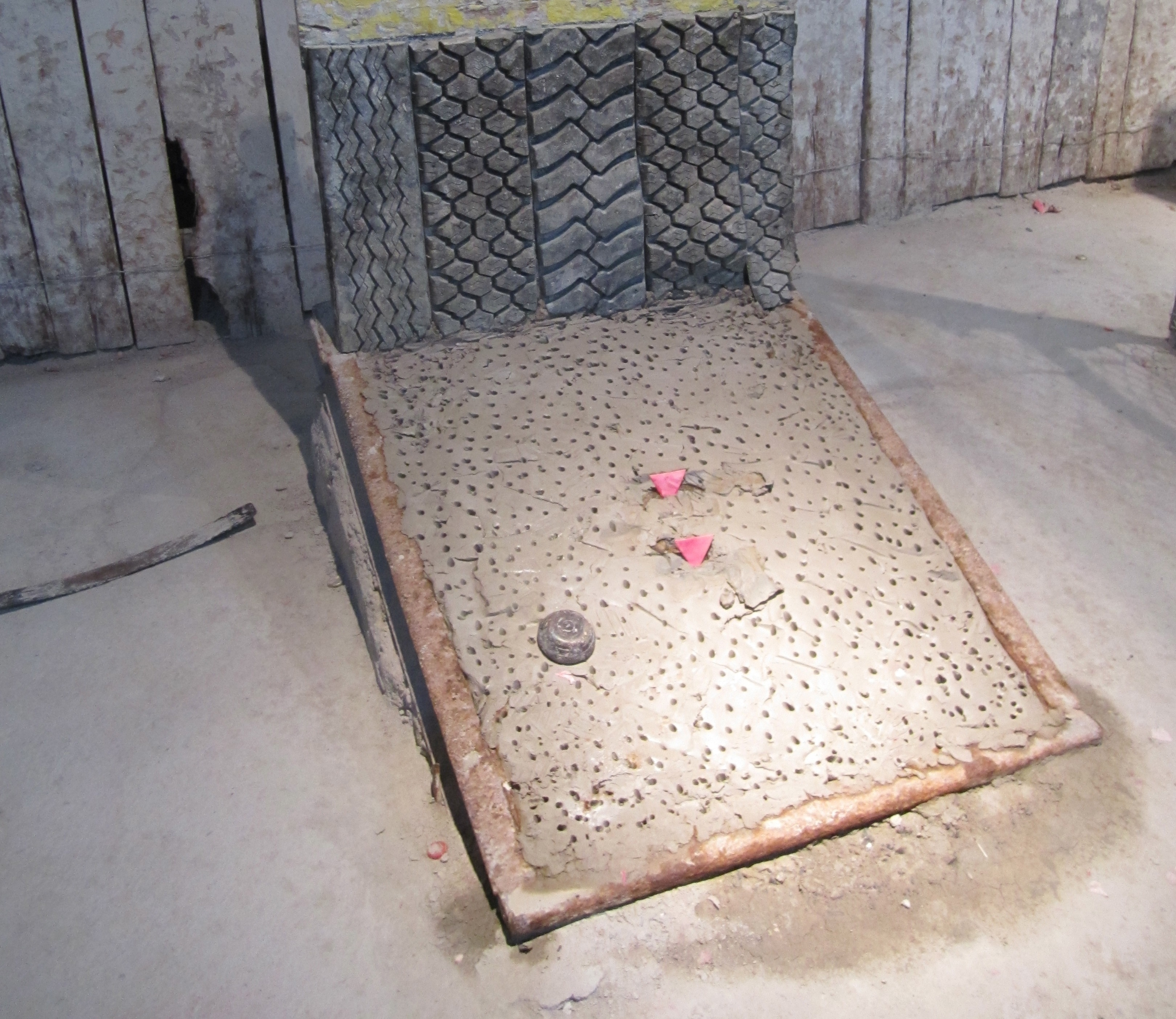
- Target post of a tejo field
- Nicknames: Turmequé
- First played: Pre-Columbian

Characteristics
- Contact: No
- Team members: individual, up to 6
- Mixed-sex: Yes
- Venue: Tejo field

Presence
- Country or region: Colombia
- Olympic: No
- Paralympic: No

Tejo (Spanish pronunciation: [ˈtexo]) or turmequé (pronounced [tuɾmeˈke]), is a traditional throwing sport from Colombia that is distinctive for its use of small targets containing gunpowder, which explode on impact.

== History ==
The exact origins of Tejo are uncertain. It is widely accepted that the sport has origins in native aboriginals from central Colombia, where it might have been played in a similar form. This form of tejo used a golden disc called a zepquagosqua, which means "I play" in the Chibcha language.

== Background ==
Tejo is a popular sport in Colombia, and some see it as a connection to the pre-Columbian era of the Americas. Only soccer has a larger and more supported industry in Colombia.

In Colombia, it is common to find professional tejo teams around the major cities and smaller towns. A few of the teams are sponsored by local companies or someone that loves tejo. In the past, the playing of tejo was accompanied by chicha (an indigenous maize-based alcoholic beverage), whereas modern tejo players refresh themselves with beer. Tejo has been widely exploited by beer companies in Colombia. Tejo aficionados are trying to change the image of the sport in popular culture from a rowdy bar game to a serious sport with a rich history. There are many people in Colombia who are in disagreement with the use of beer in this sport, and some Colombians want to prohibit alcohol companies sponsoring the game.

Modern tejo competitions are highly organized tournaments. Tournaments, known as "torneos Relampago," are the most common, and are usually played over one weekend by direct elimination of teams. Prizes include trophies, medals, and money. Household items are awarded to finalists in combination with money or coupons. Tejo has no mass media coverage, apart from the National Games, but sponsoring and targeted marketing efforts make it attractive to brands that position themselves as "popular".

Tejo has become a popular cultural activity for backpackers travelling Colombia, with a number of hostels throughout the country hosting free tejo nights. Professional tejo teams exist in neighboring countries, including Venezuela, Ecuador, and Panama. Tejo's following and industry is much less developed outside of Colombia.

== Gameplay ==
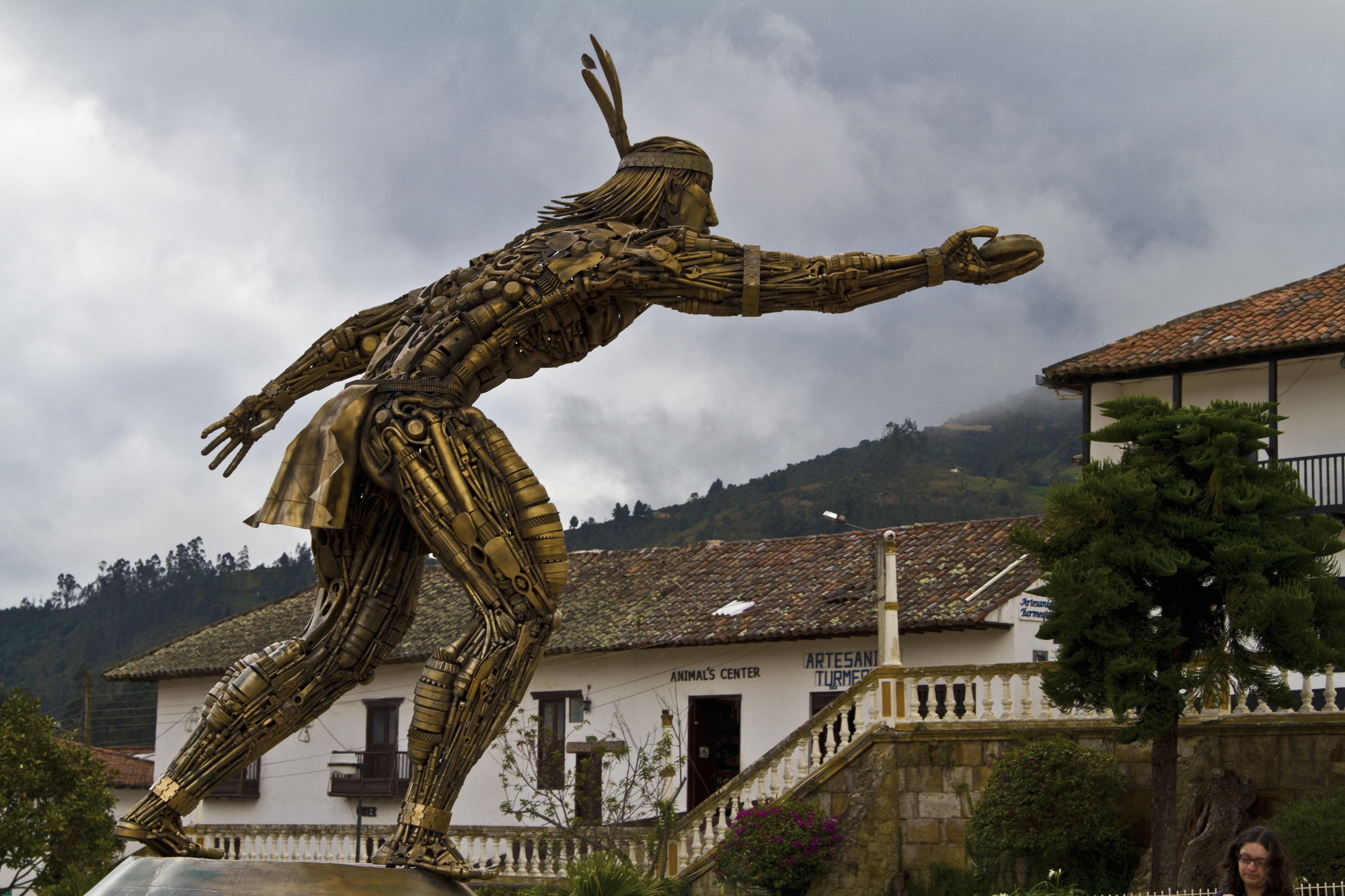
Statue in honor of the sport

The game consists of throwing a metal puck/disc (called a tejo) across a field at a 1-by-1-metre (3.3 by 3.3 ft) board at a distance of approximately 18.5 metres (20.2 yd). The board is covered with clay and set at a 45-degree angle.

Wooden frames covered in clay act as a protective board to keep the tejo from hitting other elements or people in the neighboring area, and are called tablas. Inside the tablas, there is a metal pipe or car spring, designed to cushion the impacts of the tejo. This pipe is the target where the tejo is meant to hit. The pipe is set at the same angle as the frame (45 degrees).

The tejo must be thrown from within the throwing area, and the goal is to impact the inside of the target at the end of the field. A chief characteristic of the sport is its use of small, exploding targets that contain gunpowder, commonly known as mechas. These usually triangle-shaped envelopes with explosive material inside are set on the edges of the pipe. When struck by the tejo, they explode loudly, creating a sound similar to the one created by a small revolver. Modern adaptations of tejo also exist, with electronic sensors instead of the traditional mechas being used to detect a hit.

=== Score ===
Although scoring can be arbitrary, the following format is commonly used:

- Hand: grants 1 point to the tejo that is closest to the target at the end of a round
- Hit: grants 3 points to every player that explodes a mecha
- Bulls-eye: grants 6 points to the player whose tejo has impacted inside the target
- Strike: grants 9 points to the player that scores a hit and a bulls-eye in the same throw
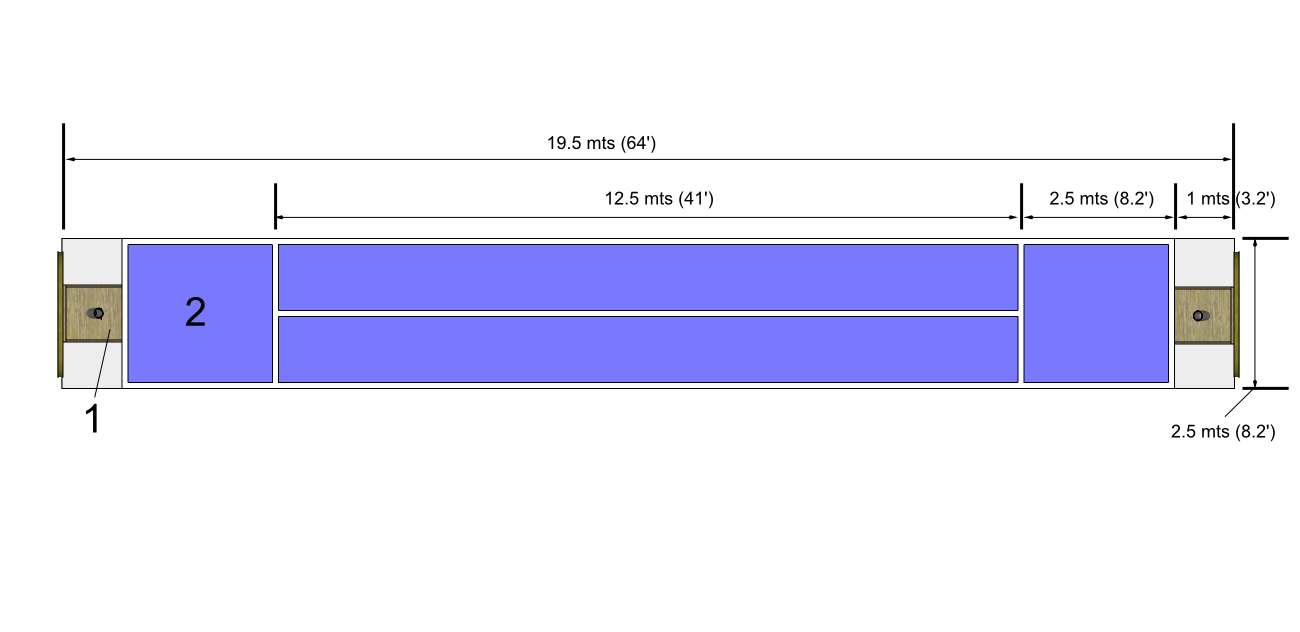
Tejo field with measurements in metric and feet. 1.Post 2.Throwing area

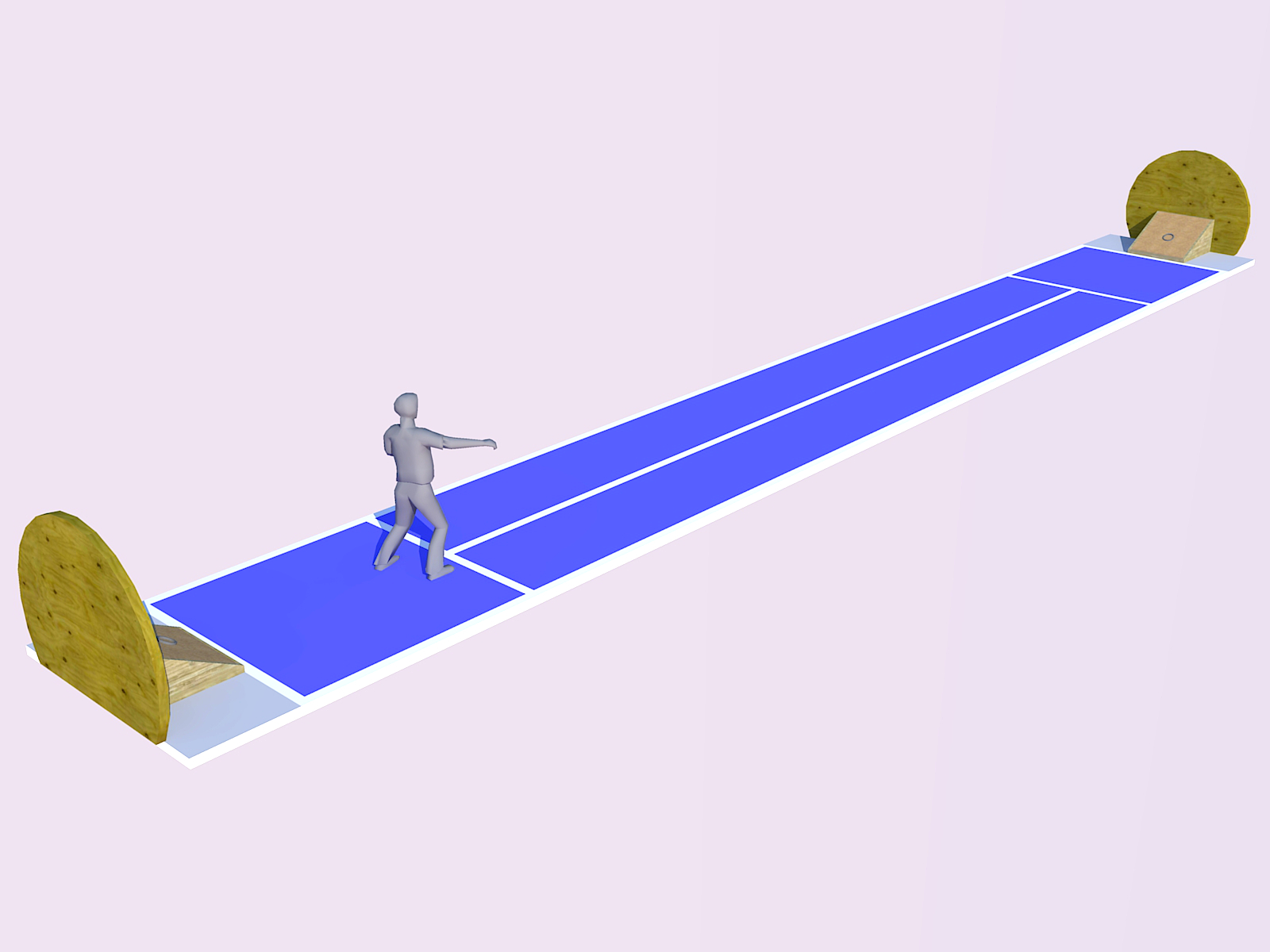
Tejo field with person and two posts visible

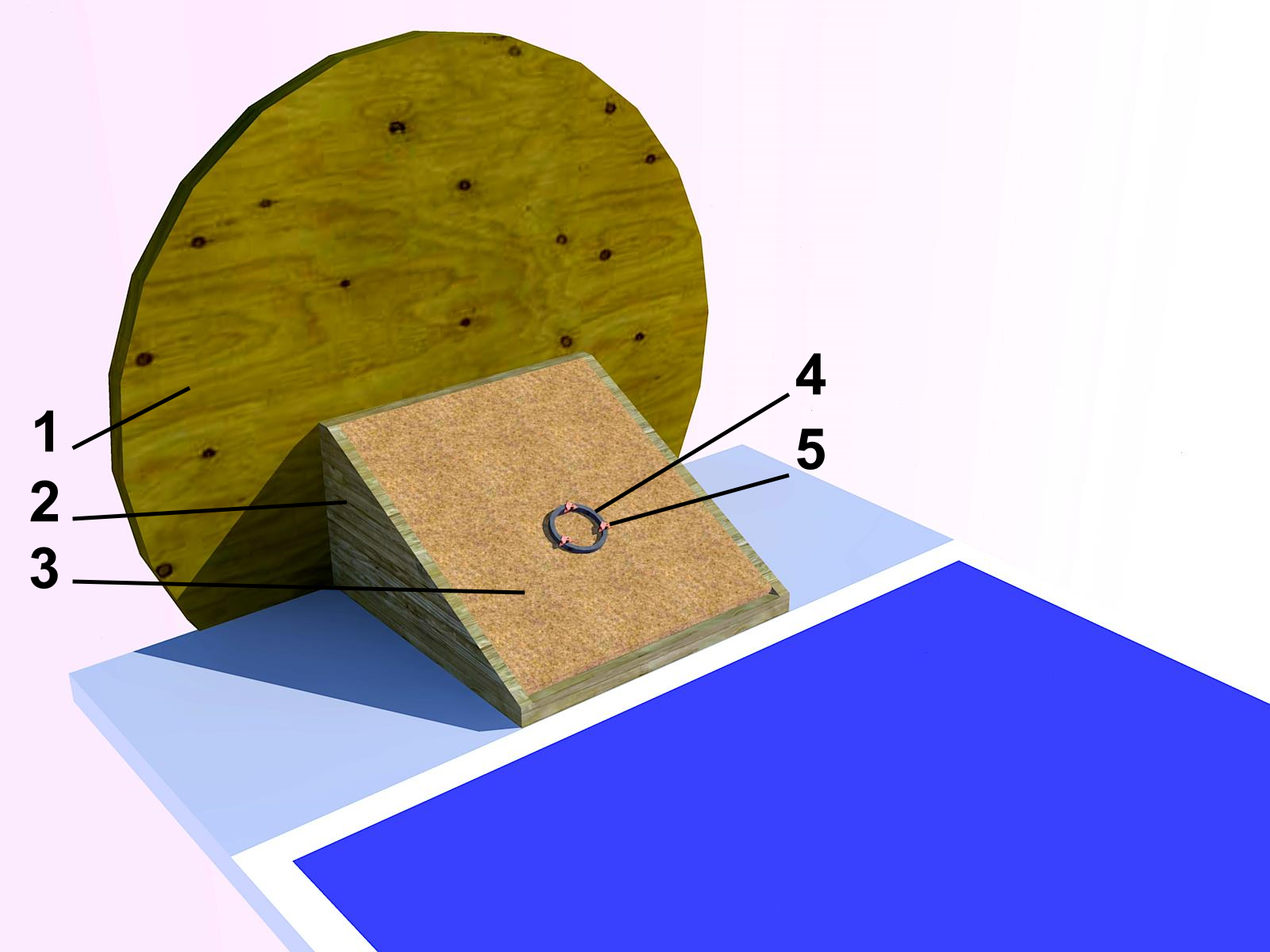
Tejo post with clay. 1.Protective board 2.Post frame 3.Clay 4.Target 5.Firecracker

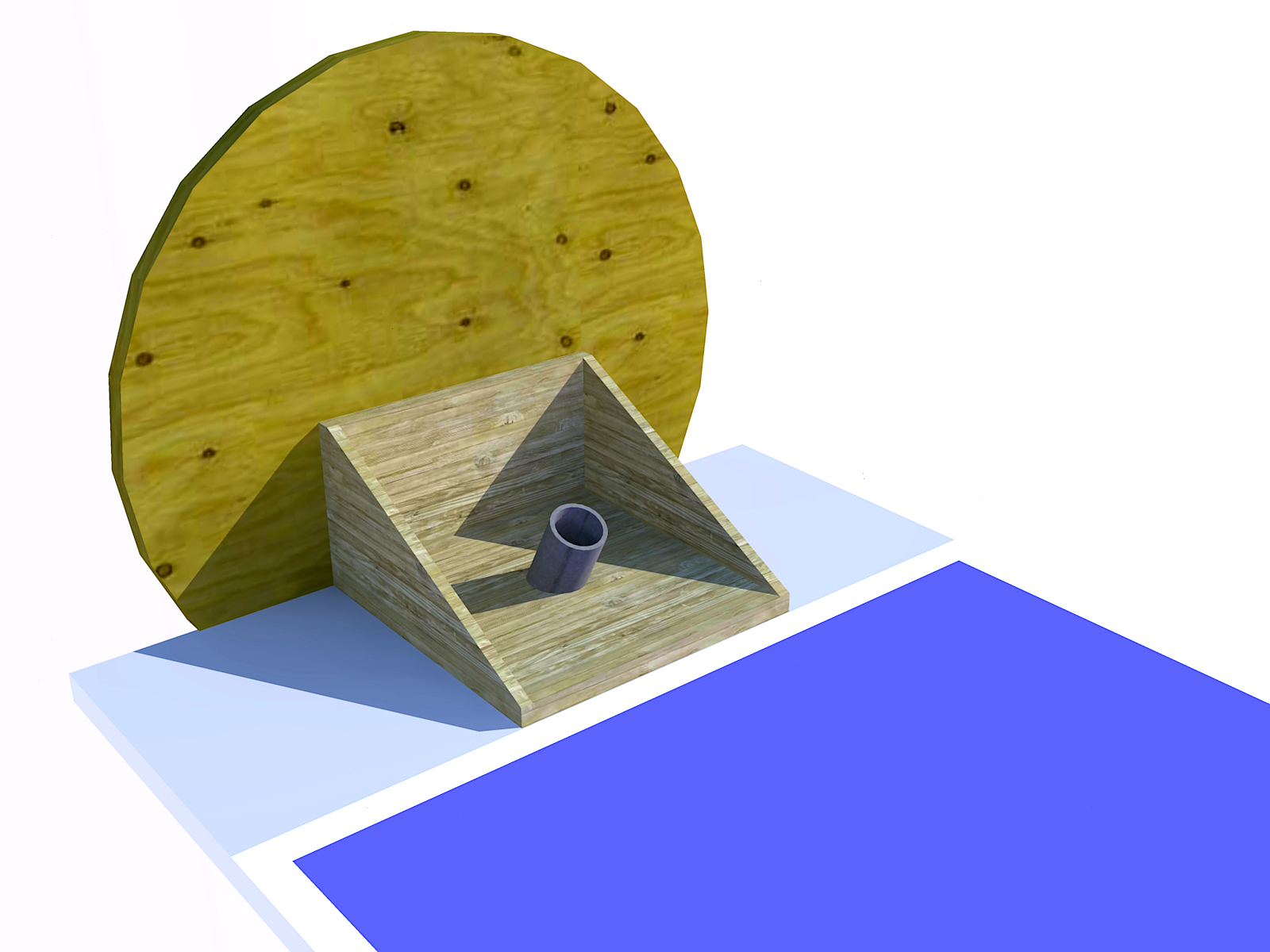
Tejo post without clay and target structure visible

== See also ==
- Chaza
- Muisca
