= Geoff Levin =

American musician

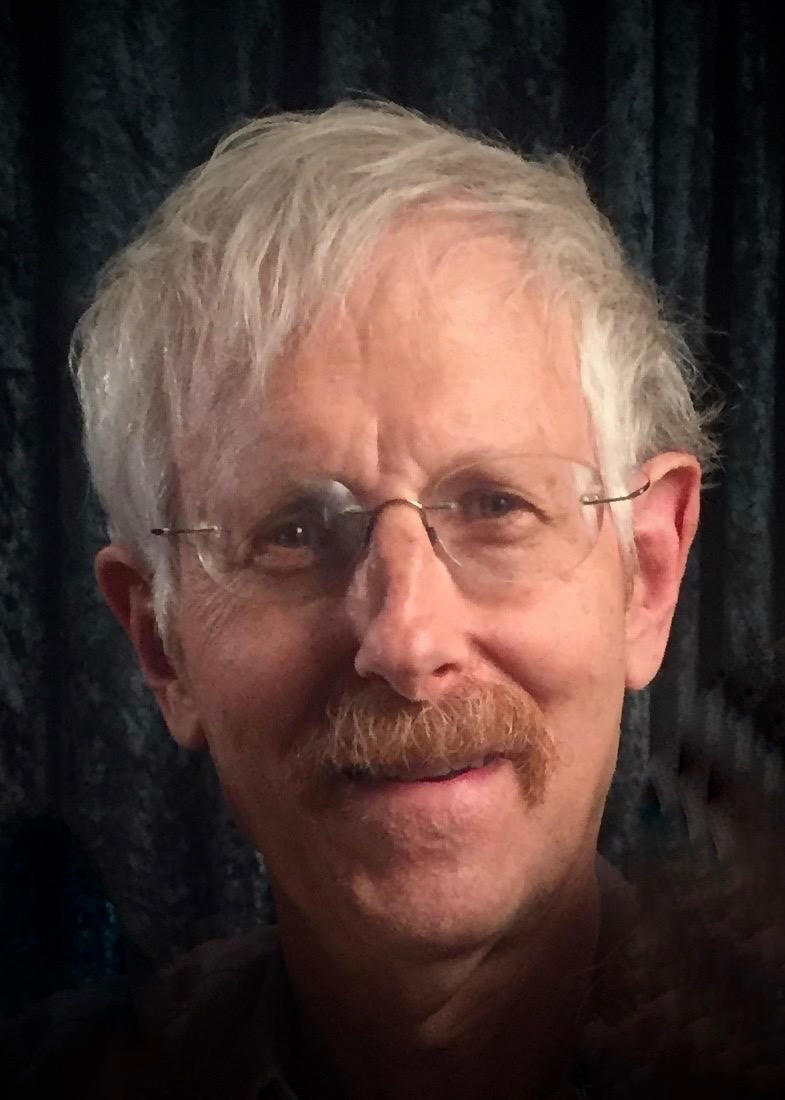

Background information
- Born: September 14, 1945 (age 80); San Francisco, California United States
- Origin: United States
- Genres: Rock, blues, film score, country, pop
- Occupations: Composer, songwriter, producer, guitarist
- Instruments: Guitar, banjo, keyboards
- Years active: 1964–present
- Website: www.geofflevin.com

Geoff Levin (born September 14, 1945) is an American rock musician, film/television composer and songwriter. Performing as part of the Black Mountain Boys with Jerry Garcia in the early years of his career, in 1968 his own group, People!, scored a hit record "I Love You" on Capitol Records. Together with Geoffrey Lewis in 1970, he created Celestial Navigations, a storytelling group, that produced 8 albums, several made the Billboard (New Age) charts. He co-composed and co-produced "The Janitor", an Academy Award-nominated animated short based on a story by Geoffrey Lewis from the album Celestial Navigations. Levin has scored over 40 full-length films and has created music used in many TV shows including The Sopranos, Chicago Fire, The Good Wife, Friends, Bloodline, SNL, Game of Thrones, Friday Night Lights, CSI, and Weeds. He co-wrote the theme song for Jakers, an Emmy and BAFTA Award-winning PBS animated series. In addition, he composed music for James Cameron's deep sea documentary, Last Mysteries of the Titanic. In 2007, as part of People!, Levin was inducted into San Jose's Rock and Roll Hall of Fame.

== Biography ==
Levin was born in San Francisco, California, to Manny Levin and Esther Bloom. Levin grew up in San Jose and attended Willow Glen High School. He began playing the guitar at 16 and started performing at 17. He performed regularly at Offstage, a folk club in San Jose founded by Paul Foster that later hosted artists including the Grateful Dead, Jefferson Airplane, Quicksilver Messenger Service, Jorma Kaukonen, Paul Kantner, Jerry Garcia David Freiberg and David Crosby, Odetta, Jesse Fuller, The Albin Brothers (members of Janis Joplin's band) and Malvina Reynolds. Levin attended San Jose State University and performed with numerous artists including Jerry Garcia and the Black Mountain Boys and his own band, The Piney Creek Ramblers with his brother Robbie Levin.

In 2017, Levin's former band People! decided to come back together to start recording their new album which includes the single Eve of Destruction. Current members include, Gene Mason, Denny Fridkin, Robb Levin, Geoff Levin, and John Tristao.

== Career ==
=== People! ===
Levin is a former member of the rock band People!.

=== Producing ===
Levin helped produced the album Tusks & Horns for artist Mayuka Thaïs which was released in May 2014. Levin and Thaïs performed the single off the album Tusks & Horns at the Global March for Elephants & Rhinos on October 4, 2014.

=== Collaboration ===
For her exhibition held at the Carnegie Art Museum, Levin collaborated with artist Bobbie Moline-Kramer by adding auditory experience to complement the art pieces.

== Personal life ==
In 1975, Levin met Diana Canova and in 1976 they were married. They divorced in 1979. In 1993, Levin married Lisa London and had two children, son Collin, and daughter Savannah. Levin and London divorced in 2006. Levin was a Scientologist for 30 years, even having served in the Sea Org, Scientology's religious order, aboard the Apollo.

== Discography ==
=== Film ===
Year	Title	Director	Studio	Notes
1983	The Measure of America	Tom Solari	Solari Communications	—
1987	Heart	James Lemmo	New World Pictures	—
1999	Spies and Lovers	Gary Graver	International Investment Holdings Ltd.	—
1989	Beyond the Stars	David Saperstein	Five Star Entertainment	—
1989	Dreamers	Robert F. Lyons	Midsummer Productions	—
1990	Nerds of a Feather	Gary Graver	—	—
1994	Skins	Wings Hauser	Single Wing Productions	—
1995	The Janitor	Vanessa Schwartz	National Film Board of Canada	Academy Award-nominated animated short based on a story by Geoffrey Lewis from the album Celestial Navigations.
1997	I'll Be Home for Christmas	Jerry London	Fremantle Media North America	—
1997	Mobius	Noel Sterrett	Admit One Pictures	—
1998	Second Chances	James Fargo	Rhineberger Organization Inc.	—
1999	Jimmy Zip	Robert McGinley	—	—
1999	A Kid Called Danger	Eric Hendershot	Speedy Films	—
1999	Wasted in Babylon	Joshua McGowan	—	—
1999	The Last Great Ride	Ralph E. Portillo	Mosquito Productions	—
2000	The Smokers	Kat Slater	International Production Company	—
2000	The Black Rose	Steven Rush	Handheld Productions	—
2001	Extreme Honor	Steven Rush	Handheld Productions	—
2002	Bloody Crisis	Gerald Barclay	Gee-Bee Productions	—
2002	Hungry Hearts	Rolf Schrader	Ascension 7 Films	—
2002	Hello	Tom Cadman	—	—
2003	Moving Alan	Christopher Shelton	Destiny Entertainment	—
2003	The Ghost Club	Ralph E. Portillo	Hemisphere Entertainment	—
2003	The Wager	Henry Crum	—	—
2003	A.N.I. 1240	Rolf Schrader	American Film Institute	—
2003	Double Negative	Tue Walin Storm	American Film Institute	—
2003	Underdog	Scott Leberecht	—	—
2003	One of Them	Ralph E. Portillo	MTI Home Video	—
2003	Natural Selection	Scott Leberecht	—	—
2004	Undercover Kids	Ralph E. Portillo	Hemisphere Entertainment	—
2004	Quiet Kill	Mark Jones	Esoteric Pictures	—
2004	Among Thieves	Oscar Daniels	Red Sea Films	—
2004	Haunted House	Conrad John	—	—
2005	United	Taron Lexton	TXL Films	—
2005	Searching for Bobby D	Paul Borghese	Neighborhood Filmworks	—
2008	Kemper	Rick Bitzelberger	Mainline Releasing	—
2005	Made for Each Other	Brad White	White Film Production	—
2005	Last Mysteries of the Titanic	Neil Flagg	Discovery Channel	—
2005	Confessions of a Pit Fighter	Art Camacho	Alliance Group Entertainment	—
2006	Strip Poker	Alex D'Lerma	Tostado Productions	—
2006	House of the Rising Sun	Bill Balas	AYM Films	—
2006	Who Made the Potatoe Salad?	Coke Daniels	Dos Bros. LLC	—
2006	Social Security Guard	Jason Cook	—	—
2007	Agenda	Jonathan de la Luz	Azisa Pictures	—
2007	The Rat Thing	Kevin Keresey	Relentless Productions	—
2007	The Tehuacan Project	Andrew Lauer	Reel-Aid	—
2007	Born	Richard Friedman	Devil's Child Picture Company	—
2007	From Fire: An Odyssey of Glass	Karen Lavender	LiveTribe Productions	—
2007	Yours Truly	Tom Wozny	—	—
2008	The Grift	Ralph E. Portillo	Hemisphere Entertainment	—
2008	Triloquist	Mark Jones	Sawyers Levine Jones Productions	—
2008	America's Phoneless	Ted Prescott	Prince / Prescott Productions	—
2008	Nine Fourteen	Carolyn Bevacqua	—	—
2009	Set Apart	Ralph E. Portillo	Hemisphere Entertainment	—
2009	Becoming Jesse Tate	Ralph E. Portillo	GodFilms	—
2009	Flying By	Jim Amatulli	Arte Films	—
2009	Spaceman on Earth	Shant Hamassian	—	—
2011	Dreams Awake	Jerry Alden Deal	Susan Johnston Casting	—
2011	Midnight Son	Scott Leberecht	Free Lunch Productions	—
2012	Henry	Collin Mckenzee Levin	—	—
2012	iVOTE	Rob Adler	—	—
2013	Avec amour	Collin Mckenzee Levin	—	—
2013	Halfway to Hell	Richard Friedman	APT. 1B Productions	—
2013	The Homecoming	Jan Tussing	Blue Boots Entertainment	—
2013	Noah Hammer	Joao Gabriel Kowalski	—	—
2013	Flabbergasted	Bruno B. Campelo	—	—
2014	Finding Harmony	Dagen Merrill	Once Upon A Dream	—
2016	In Search of Liberty	Norm Novitsky	Blu Nile Films	—

=== Television ===
Title	Year	Notes
Smothers Brothers Comedy Hour	1988-1989	Paul Brownstein Productions
Street Sharks	1994-1996	DIC Entertainment
What if	1996	Barraclough Carey Productions
Perfect Assassins	1998	Promark Entertainment Group
Beauty	1998	Citadel Entertainment
As Time Runs Out	1999	Fremantle Media North America
Riddle of the Desert Mummies	1999	Terra Nova Television
Sabrina, the Animated Series	1999	Buena Vista Television
K2: Surviving the Mountain	2001	National Geographic Channel
Jakers! The Adventures of Piggley Winks	2003	Entara Ltd.
UnDetectables	2005	Discovery Channel
ChalkZone	2004-2005	Frederator Studios
Last Mysteries of the Titanic	2005	Last Mysteries of the Titanic
Random! Cartoons	2007	Frederator Studios

=== TV movies ===
Year	Title	Director	Studio	Notes
1992	The Price She Paid	Fred Walton	Sandyhook Productions	—
1997	I'll Be Home for Christmas	Jerry London	Fremantle Media North America	—
1999	As Time Runs Out	John de Graaf	—	
2001	The Valley of the T-Rex	Reuben Aaronson	Discovery Channel	—

=== Documentary ===
Year	Title	Director	Studio	Notes
2005	Answering the Call: Ground Zero's Volunteers	Lou Angeli	Chesca Media Group LLC	—
2007	Google Me	—	Killeen Films	—

=== Videos ===
Title	Year	Director	Notes
Hot Boyz	2002	Master P	No Limit Films
Far on Foot	2001	Stephanie R.M. Smith	Sisyphs Productions
Dark Wolf	2003	Richard Friedman	DarkWolf Picture Company LLC
One of Them	2003	N/A	N/A
Maisie Undercover: Shadow Boxer	2006	J.W. McHausen	MRG Entertainment
Succubus: Hell-Bent	2007	Kim Bass	V1 Cut Productions
Kemper	2008	Rick Bitzelberger	Mainline Releasing

=== Albums ===
Title	Artist	Year	Role	Labels
Little Wheel Spin and Spin	Buffy Sainte-Marie	1966	Lead guitar	Vanguard
I Love You	People!	1968	Lead guitar	Capitol Records
Both Sides of People	People!	1969	Lead guitar	Capitol Records
Isle of View	Jimmie Spheeris	1971	Lead guitar	CBS
Original Tap Dancing Kid	Jimmie Spheeris	1973	Lead guitar	Epic
The Eloquent Elephant	Dick Glass	1974	Lead guitar	Moonwatcher
Falling into Spring	Rita Coolidge	1974	Energy bow, dobro	A&M Records
Wings Livinryte	Wings Hauser	1975	Elbow, Guitar	RCA Victor
The Dragon Is Dancing	Jimmy Spheeris	1975	Lead guitar	Epic
Port of the Heart	Jimmy Spheeris	1976	Lead guitarist	Epic
Laverne and Shirley Sing	Laverne and Shirley	1976	Songwriter	Oh Gee!
Live at McCabes	Larry McNeely, Geoff Levin, and Jack Skinner	1977	N/A	Flying Fish
Confederation	Larry McNeely, Geoff Levin, and Jack Skinner	1977	N/A	Sheffield Labs
Celestial Navigations Chapter 1	Celestial Navigations	1986	N/A	K-tel
Celestial Navigations Chapter 2	Celestial Navigations	1989	N/A	N/A
After Midnight	Larry McNeely, Geoff Levin, and Jack Skinner	1990	N/A	Sheffield Labs
Celestial Navigations Ice Chapter 3	Celestial Navigations	1992	N/A	N/A
Celestial Navigations Road Train Chapter 4	Celestial Navigations	1995	N/A	N/A
Celestial Navigations The Connection Chapter 5	Celestial Navigations	2005	N/A	N/A
Live at the Matrix	Celestial Navigations	2006	N/A	N/A
Celestial Navigations Space Racer Chapter 6	Celestial Navigations	2008	N/A	N/A
Celestial Navigations War Chapter 7	Celestial Navigations	2008	N/A	N/A
Tusks & Horns	Mayuka Thaïs	2014	Producer	Independent

=== Singles ===
Title	Artist	Year	Role	Labels
I Love You	People!	1968	Lead guitar	Capitol Records
I Love You/Somebody Tell Me My Name	People!	1968	Lead guitar	Capitol Records
Crying Shoes	People!	1968	Lead guitar	Capitol Records
Apple Cider/Ashes of Me	People!	1968	Lead guitar	Capitol Records
Ulla/Turnin' Me In	People!	1968	Lead guitar	Capitol Records

== Video interviews ==
- "An interview with Mat Gleason, Coagula Art Journal, Modern Art Blitz, Bobbie Moline-Kramer and Geoff Levin" 2017
- "The Jerry Bovino Show - Rock and Roll Brothers with Robbie Levin, Geoff Levin, and Host Jerry Bovino" 2017

== Awards ==
Year	Award	Category	Work	Result
2013	Action on Film	Best Score - Feature	Half Way to Hell	Nominated
