= Google Me =

Google Me may refer to:

- "Google Me" (Teyana Taylor song), 2007 song
- "Google Me" (Kim Zolciak song), 2010 song
- "Google Me!", poem by Saviana Stănescu
- Google Me (film), American film
