= Airlines of the Jet Age =

2011 book by R. E. G. Davies

Airlines of the Jet Age: A History
- Author: R. E. G. Davies
- Language: English
- Subject: Aviation history
- Genre: Non-fiction
- Publisher: Smithsonian Institution Scholarly Press in collaboration with Rowman & Littlefield
- Publication date: June 2011
- Publication place: Washington, D.C., United States
- Media type: Print
- ISBN: 978-0-9788460-8-4

Airlines of the Jet Age: A History is a book by the English author R. E. G. Davies published in 2011 by the Smithsonian Institution Scholarly Press in collaboration with Rowman & Littlefield. It was Davies' last book, dying shortly after its publication on 30 July 2011.
