= Bobbie Moline-Kramer =

American painter

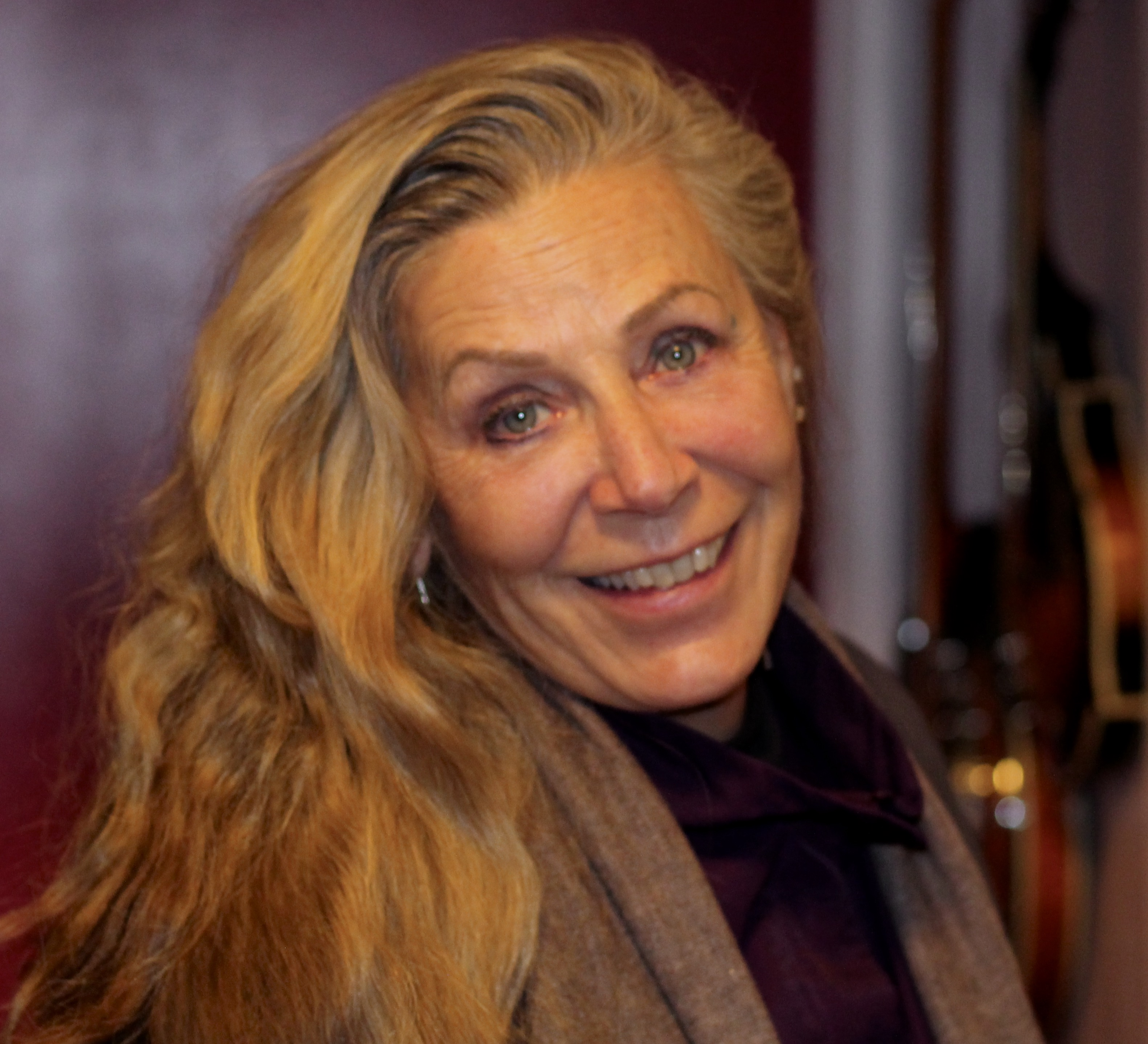
- Bobbie Moline-Kramer
- Born: November 4, 1946 (age 79); Fort Madison, Iowa, United States
- Education: California State University, Long Beach, United States
- Website: molinekramer.com

Bobbie Moline-Kramer (born November 4, 1946) is an American artist, lecturer, teacher, and illustrator. Her work includes Japanese Shunga style paintings, gestural abstraction, animal symbolism, and realism.

== Biography ==
Moline-Kramer was born in Fort Madison, Iowa. Her interest in the professional art field developed after she took a course at a California Community College with the Conceptual Art pioneer John Baldessari and periodic work with Allan Kaprow. She attended Art Center College of Design and later transferred to California State University, Long Beach where she received her BFA with a double major in Biology and Illustration in 1981. Moline-Kramer has experimented with hyperrealism, mixed media experimentation, gestural abstraction, personal narrative, and deep art historical crate-digging. She was the president and chairman of the board of the Society of Illustrators, Los Angeles, and an adjunct professor at Cal State University Long Beach. Moline-Kramer's works are exhibited in Warner Brothers Studios, The Wall Street Journal, Smithsonian Institution, Carnegie Art Museum (Oxnard, California), John Kerr, and Long Beach Museum of Art. Moline-Kramer began collaborating with musician Geoff Levin on ''Musical Brushstrokes" a project where they fuse music and art and turn it into a song.

Moline-Kramer has had over 130 exhibitions to date which include solo exhibitions in numerous California galleries, and group shows at nonprofit venues such as the Museum of Contemporary Art (MOCA), Los Angeles; the Santa Monica Museum of Art; the Carnegie Art Museum (Oxnard, California); and the Long Beach Museum of Art. Moline-Kramer displays her work in museums, participates in shows, teaches oil painting classes, and lectures.

Moline-Kramer has previously served as president of the Society of Illustrators of Los Angeles.

== Collaboration ==
Moline-Kramer collaborated with artist Geoff Levin for her exhibition held at the Carnegie Art Museum (Oxnard, California) to add auditory experience to complement the art pieces.

== Awards ==
Moline-Kramer has won numerous awards including winning first place in the two-dimensional art section for her painting "In the Mind's Eye, I, Me, Mine" for the Carnegie Art Museum (Oxnard, California)'s A Classic Competition. A juried exhibition featuring all media.

- 825 Gallery, Los Angeles Art Association – 2003, Artist Award
- San Diego Art Institute’s 44th Exhibit – 2000, First Place in Show
- Salmagundi Club, New York, New York – 2000, The Joseph Hartley Memorial Award
- Carnegie Art Museum (Oxnard, California) – 1998 & 1999, First Place in Painting
- Bausch & Lomb 7th Annual Exhibition – 1998, First Place in Painting
- California Art Club – 1997, Exhibit Award Winner
- Society of Illustrators – 1991, Judges Award
- Society of Illustrators – 1989, Gold Medal, 1991 Judges Award

== Video interviews and lectures ==
- "An interview with Bobbie Moline-Kramer by Peter Frank (art critic)" 2015
- "Bobbie Moline-Kramer talk at Moorpark College" 2016
- "Carnegie Museum Art Panel - Oxnard 2016: Bobbie Moline-Kramer" 2016
- "An interview with Mat Gleason Coagula Art Journal Modern Art Blitz Bobbie Moline-Kramer & Geoff Levin" 2017
