= Keri Rosebraugh =

American artist and art administrator

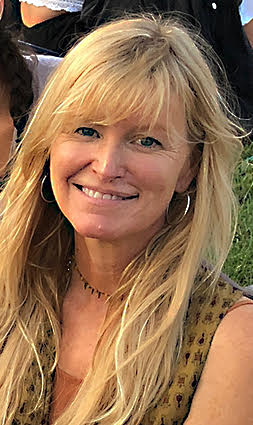
- Rosebraugh at a 2019 exhibition.
- Born: Portland, Oregon, US
- Education: Art Center College of Design, Pasadena
- Known for: Paintings, Sculpture, Video, Installation Art
- Website: www.kerirosebraugh.com

Keri Rosebraugh is an American artist and art administrator. Her artworks often deal with ecological themes and focus on human being's relationship with nature.

== Art education and career ==
Keri Rosebraugh is an American artist who lives and works in Marnay Sur Seine, France and Los Angeles, California. Her artworks often deal with ecological themes and focus on human being's relationship with nature.

Rosebraugh was born to Fred and Marilyn Rosebraugh in Portland, Oregon. She grew up in Tigard, Oregon where she attended Tigard High School. In 2018 she was inducted into Tigard High School's Distinguished Alumni, an award bestowed to a former student who has made significant contributions to the greater good of the community, country, or state. In 1986 she began studying at Art Center College of Design, in Pasadena. She graduated with honors and a BFA, Art Center College of Design, Pasadena, CA in illustration in 1989. From 1989 through 2013 Rosebraugh's illustration clients included The New York Times Book Review, the Los Angeles Times, The Peterson Automotive Museum, the San Francisco Chronicle, Harcourt Brace, The Biography Channel, The History Channel, Disney Consumer Products, DreamWorks SKG, Rosetta Getty, the Toronto Star, and the Miami New Times.

Rosebraugh's associations with environmentally conscious groups include Grist, Mother Earth News and Earth Island Journal, with all of whom she was an active participant and contributor. In September 2011, she collaborated with Peter Schulberg and Barefoot Wines to create a large-scale mural composed entirely of trash to promote "One Beach", a film series highlighting the innovative creations of artists who support clean and sustainable beaches. The mural went on display in Venice, California. In 2013, Rosebraugh was awarded first place in the San Diego Museum of Art Artist Guild's juried exhibition titled, "Contemporary Expression - The Creative Spirit."

In 2014 Rosebraugh moved to Florence, Italy and attended Studio Arts Centers International, where she received an MFA, Studio Art Centers International, Florence, Italy in Studio Arts. In 2015 she collaborated with French artist Philippe Nodluaner to create a large scale installation showing support and solidarity for Paris after the terrorist attacks on November 13, 2015. The form was created using 200 baguettes in the shape of an Ankh on the banks of the River Seine in Paris. In 2016, a giclee of the installation became part of the permanent collection of the Museo d’Arte Contemporania di Florina, in Greece. Rosebraugh's artwork was included into three month long group exhibitions titled Gaia I, Gaia II, and Gaia III in Paris, France in conjunction with the International Summit on Climate Change: City Hall (2nd arrondissement), Maison Bleue, and Galerie Amarrage. Her artwork was also shown in Artclash 2016 at the Sala d’Arme in Palazzo Vecchio in Florence, Italy and Plantarium at Casa de Carraresi in Treviso, Italy. In October 2016, Rosebraugh's artwork was included into the Natural History Museum/State Darwin Museum in Moscow, Russia for an exhibition on ecology titled Now & After. In 2017 her work was part of a group show titled After Hours at the Main Museum in Los Angeles and in 2018 at Yonsei University in Seoul, Korea as part of the GAMMA Young Artist's Exhibition. Rosebraugh is currently working on a 12-foot sculptural commission mixing indigenous wood from the Oregon coast and copper metal to form a large scale shape similar to a tree and antler. This will be installed in early 2020 at the Sweetshop in Gearhart, Oregon.

Rosebraugh has had three solo exhibitions: Nature And Man at the Cartavetra Galleria in Florence, Italy (2016), Nature And Man at the Nuetra institute Gallery and Museum in Los Angeles, California (2016) and God's Logos at the Co-op Gallery in Los Angeles, California. (2011) Her next solo exhibition will take place in Gearhart, Oregon at the Sweetshop, in conjunction with the Clatsop County Arts Summit 2019.

=== Art administration ===
Keri Rosebraugh served as the president of the Society of Illustrators of Los Angeles for two years and is a member of the board of directors for the Eco-Logical Art Gallery of Los Angeles, a non-profit eco-focused art gallery. In 2008 and 2009, she participated in the gallery's "Drive-By" public art exhibitions which converted billboards across Los Angeles and San Francisco – replacing advertisement spaces with original artwork – under the direction of gallery owner Peter Schulberg.

From 2012 to 2014 she managed the adult arts program for the Cultural Affairs Department of Los Angeles at Barnsdall Art Park. Rosebraugh taught drawing and painting at Barnsdall Art Park from 1997 - 2014. She was a teacher and the assistant to artistic director Carole Robb for the Rome Art Program in 2016 in Rome Italy. Rosebraugh taught illustration classes at the Pacific Northwest College of Art in Portland, Oregon from 1992 to 1994.

In the summer of 2019 Rosebraugh collaborated with Mathilde Rousseau Domec to create L’Expressoir, an artist residency program in Marnay Sur Seine, France which focuses on bringing people together to emphasize the importance of meaningful and multi-layered cultural exchanges through music and art. She currently serves as the director of L’Expressoir.

Rosebraugh also serves as a board member of Responsible Education and Media, a Los Angeles-based non-profit organization with a stated goal of "raising public awareness and consciousness of social and political issues concerning the global community" by exploiting the fields of art and entertainment.

=== Articles, Press ===
Articles, Press Solidarity Art in Paris - Strength in Baguettes, The Florentine newspaper, 2015 Campus Italia - editione 2015 seconda serie, RAI television interview, RAI World, 2015 First Place Award of Excellence - Artist Profile, San Diego Museum of Art Artist's Guild, 2013 Beautiful Sign Is Made From Garbage, Mother Nature Network, 2013 G Word television episode on billboard artists re Eco-LA Gallery, Discovery's Planet Green, 2012 Time Lapse YouTube video of One Beach Mural, Barefoot Wines, 2012 Keri Rosebraugh's Eco-Art Tackles Themes of Destruction, Reuse, Mother Nature Network, 2011 21st Century Gargoyles Drawn on Found Paper, Treehugger 2011

== Selected exhibitions ==
- 2013 Eco Art (Group show): Malibu Lumber Yard Gallery, Malibu, CA.
- 2011 Gods' Logos (Solo Show): Co-op 28 Gallery, Los Angeles, CA.
- 2011 Navigating LA (Group show): The Studio for Southern California History, Los Angeles, CA.
- 2010 SHFT Pop up Exhibition (Group show): The Continental, Los Angeles, CA.
- 2009 Satsuma 7 (Group show): Satsuma Gallery, North Hollywood, CA.
- 2009 Wisdom Within Us (Group show): Create: Fixate @ Premiere Events Center, Los Angeles, CA.
- 2008 Recycled Billboard Exhibition (Group show): Eco-logical Art Gallery, Los Angeles, CA.
- 2007 Cannibal Flower Exhibition (Group show): Los Angeles, CA.
- 2006 Everything But The Kitchen Sync (Group show): La Luz De Jesus Gallery, Hollywood, CA.
- 2005 Society of Illustrator's Member Exhibition (Group show): New York, NY.
- 2004 Junior Arts Center Gallery (Group show): Barnsdall Park, Los Angeles, CA.
- 1999 Arroyo Arts Collective Jail Exhibition (Group show): Los Angeles, CA.

== See also ==
- Environmental art
- Environmental movement
- Greenmuseum.org
- Sustainable art
