= Bert Rose =

American football executive (1919–2001)

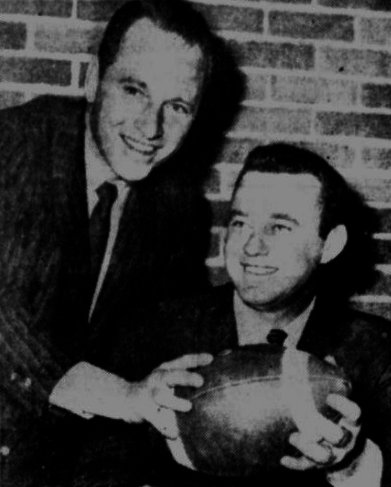
- Rose (left) with Norm Van Brocklin (right) in 1961

Personal information
- Born: September 26, 1919; Seattle, Washington, U.S.
- Died: October 14, 2001 (aged 82); Dallas, Texas, U.S.

Career information
- College: University of Washington

Career history
- University of Washington (1947–1952) Director of sports publicity; University of Washington (1952–1955) Assistant athletic director; Los Angeles Rams (1955–1959) Public relations director; Minnesota Vikings (1960–1963) General manager; Los Angeles Rams (1964) Assistant to the president; National Football League (1965–1966) Assistant to the commissioner for college relations; New Orleans Saints (1967) General manager; Philadelphia Eagles (1968) Assistant director of player personnel; Texas Stadium (1969–1988) General manager
- Executive profile at Pro Football Reference

Bert E. Rose Jr. (September 26, 1919 – October 14, 2001) was an American football executive who served as the first general manager of the Minnesota Vikings, New Orleans Saints, and Texas Stadium.

== Biography ==
=== Early life ===
Rose received a degree in journalism from the University of Washington in 1941. He was the commander of a United States Navy submarine chaser during World War II. After the war, Rose worked in the public relations department at Boeing. In 1947, he returned to his alma mater as director of sports publicity. In 1952 he was promoted to assistant athletic director. In 1955 he succeeded Pete Rozelle as public relations director of the Los Angeles Rams.

=== Minnesota Vikings ===
On August 5, 1960, Rose was named general manager of Minneapolis's National Football League expansion team. Rose is credited with coining the Vikings name for the new team. The moniker was intended, Rose said, to serve the dual purpose of representing an aggressive entity imbued with the will to win as well as to pay tribute to the people of Scandinavia, the descendants of whom are quite populous in the Minnesota region. He recommended the Vikings name to the team's board of directors and it was adopted on September 17, 1960.

He selected Los Angeles cartoonist Karl Hubenthal to design the team's helmet, uniforms and logo and chose the team's purple and gold colors to match those used by his alma mater, the University of Washington. He hired former Philadelphia Eagles quarterback Norm Van Brocklin to serve as the team's first coach. In his three seasons as GM, the Vikings compiled a 10–30–2 and failed to make the playoffs. He resigned on June 1, 1964.

=== Assistant to the commissioner ===
After leaving the Vikings, Rose returned to the Rams as a special assistant to team president Dan Reeves. In February 1965 he was appointed as special assistant to the commissioner for college relations. In this role, Rose headed up the league's babysitting program, which employed about 150 men to steer college prospects away from the rival American Football League. He was also in charge of ticket sales for the first Super Bowl.

=== New Orleans Saints ===
In 1966, Rose was on the screening committee that interviewed prospective owners for the league's expansion franchise in New Orleans. John W. Mecom Jr., son of Texas oilman John W. Mecom Sr. and the owner of the Mecom Racing Team, was chosen over William G. Helis Jr., Herman Lay, Louis J. Roussel Jr., Jack Sanders, and Edgar B. Stern Jr. On July 20, 1967, Rose was named general manager of the New Orleans Saints. The team went 3–11 in its inaugural season. In April 1968 he was replaced by the Saints director of player personnel Vic Schwenk.

=== Texas Stadium ===
After leaving the Saints, Rose served as assistant personnel director of the Philadelphia Eagles. He was fired in 1969 by the team's new general manager, Pete Retzlaff. On June 28, 1969, he was hired to manage Texas Stadium, which was then under construction. He was responsible for bringing high school football to the stadium. He retired in 1988 and remained in Dallas until his death on October 14, 2001.
