= Joseph Morgan Henninger =

American artist and illustrator

- Born: May 15, 1906; Elwood, Indiana, U.S.
- Died: March 7, 1999 (aged 92); Pacific Palisades, Los Angeles, California, U.S.
- Education: Beaux-Arts de Paris
- Occupations: Artist; illustrator
- Spouse: Danica

Joseph Morgan Henninger (May 15, 1906 – March 7, 1999) was an American artist and illustrator. He was born in Elwood, Indiana and died in Pacific Palisades, California.

Henninger was an accomplished painter and sculptor. He also became a commercial artist, an illustrator, and a teacher of "Croquie". He was a founding member and the first president of the Society of Illustrators of Los Angeles (1953). The Society has established an annual award in his name to honor a top illustrator.

He was a graduate of École des Beaux-Arts in Paris. He had won a four-year scholarship for a painting submitted to the Thomas Award competition. Upon graduating, he returned to Indiana and set up a portrait studio in Indianapolis. Later, he moved to Chicago, and then to the Arizona State University where he painted two murals. Finally, he settled in Los Angeles, California and his career as an illustrator, commercial artist, and teacher began. He taught classes at the Art Center College of Design for 36 years and many of his students became outstanding artists.

Henninger also worked in the film industry, providing illustrations and set designs for Vincent Korda, Selznick Studios, Walt Disney, United Artists, MGM, and Columbia. During World War II, he headed the Illustration Department of Lockheed Aircraft where he created perspective drawings of aircraft.

Throughout his career years, Henninger continued to create fine art, including paintings in oil, acrylic and, primarily, watercolor. He traveled extensively in Europe to find subjects and locations for his paintings and also made several trips to Japan. An example of his skill and attention to detail is the watercolor shown at the right, depicting 33 scenes of Spain on a single canvas.

His works are on display in private collections and museums, including the Pentagon. In the Air Force Academy Art Collection. can be seen several of his paintings, including a portrait of Chuck Yeager. At the Tempe Campus of Arizona State University there are two murals painted by Henninger: Spanish Influence in Arizona and Industrial Development in Arizona. Industrial Development in Arizona addresses the theme of the five C's of Arizona: Cotton, copper, cattle, climate and citrus. Henninger received a commission to paint the murals in 1934 as part of the Public Works of Art Project. Henninger is also the author and illustrator of several books, one of the most important of which is Drawing of the Hand and Its Anatomy, published in 1973.

Henninger was President of the California Art Club in 1965, and was also elected to several terms as president of the Art Directors Guild. He was a member of the National Watercolor Society. "American Artist" Magazine recognized Joseph Morgan Henninger as "...one of the most influential watercolorists of the latter half of the twentieth century." (from the California Art Club Newsletter, June/July 1999)

== See also ==
- California Art Club
- California Plein-Air Painting
- American Impressionism
