= Deal of a Lifetime =

- Deal of a Lifetime US DVD cover
- Directed by: Paul Levine
- Written by: Katharine R. Sloan
- Produced by: Daniel Helberg; Yorman Pelman
- Starring: Kevin Pollak; Shiri Appleby; Michael A. Goorjian
- Cinematography: Denise Brassard
- Edited by: Marcus Manton
- Music by: Daryl Orenge; Amotz Plessner
- Distributed by: Mgm/Ua Studios
- Release date: 1999
- Running time: 94 minutes
- Country: United States
- Language: English

Deal of a Lifetime is a 1999 US romantic comedy film starring Shiri Appleby, Michael A. Goorjian, and Kevin Pollak.

== Plot ==
The film centers on the main character Henry Spooner (played by Goorjian), the school nerd who has a crush on Laurie, the prettiest, most popular girl in his high school. After a conversation with his friend, he mutters under his breath that he would sell his soul to the Devil to go out with Laurie. From that point on, he gets his wish to date Laurie, but things don't go according to plan.

== Cast ==
- Michael A. Goorjian as Henry Spooner
- Shiri Appleby as Laurie Petler
- Kevin Pollak as Jerry
- Jennifer Rubin as Tina
- Ashley Buccille as Ramona
- Esteban Powell as Foster
- Eli Craig as Kevin Johnson
- Jane Carr as Nancy
- A.J. Buckley as Axe
- Shay Astar as Peggy Doozer
- Ron Glass as Mr. Creighton

== Music ==
Part of the soundtrack includes the song "Let Yourself Go", which was written and performed by Los Angeles musician Paul Delph for his final album A God That Can Dance. The song is included in the final scene.

== Home media ==
The film was released on DVD on October 31, 2000.
