= People! =

American music group

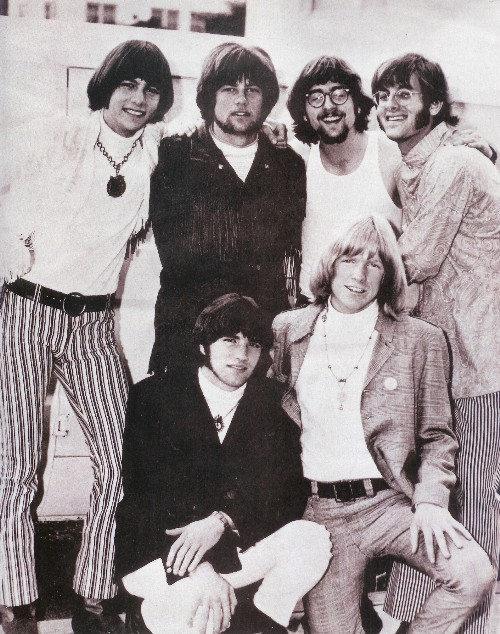
- People! 1968 Back Row: (left to right) Robb Levin (bass), Denny Fridkin (drums), Al Ribisi (organ), Geoff Levin (guitar); Front Row: Gene Mason and Larry Norman (both vocals)

Background information
- Origin: San Jose, California, U.S.
- Genres: Psychedelic rock
- Years active: 1965–1971, 1974, 2006–2007, 2018–present
- Past members: Robb Levin; Geoff Levin; Albert Ribisi; John Riolo; David Anderson; Larry Norman; Gene Mason; Denny Fridkin; Tom Tucker; Scott Eason; John Tristao; Steve Boatwright; Rob Thomas

People! was an American one-hit wonder rock band that was formed in San Jose, California in 1965. Their greatest chart success came with their summer hit single "I Love You". The song, written by The Zombies bass guitarist Chris White, rose to number one in Japan (twice), Israel, Australia, Italy, South Africa, and the Philippines, and peaked at No. 14 on the Billboard Hot 100 in June 1968. At various times, band members have included Robb Levin, Geoff Levin, Albert Ribisi, John Riolo, David Anderson, Larry Norman, Gene Mason, Denny Fridkin, Tom Tucker, Bruce Thomas Eason (as Scott Eason), John Tristao, Steve Boatwright, and Rob Thomas. On October 19, 2007, People! was inducted into the San Jose Rocks Hall of Fame.

After People! broke up, Larry Norman became one of the pioneers of Christian rock music.

People! later recorded an album which was funded through an Indiegogo campaign in May 2018. Current members include Gene Mason, Denny Fridkin, Robb Levin, Geoff Levin, and John Tristao.

== Scientology connection ==
After all of the band members except lead singers Norman and Mason embraced Scientology, Norman claimed other members of the band issued the ultimatum: Join Scientology or leave the band. Norman and Mason both refused. Some band members indicate that Norman was asked to leave the band because he was seen as a "Suppressive Person". Norman claimed that he was harassed by other members of Scientology. On the Jerry Bovino TV show, Eye on Aspen, brothers Robbie and Geoff Levin clarified that they kicked Larry Norman out of the group based on their interpretation of Scientology policy categorizing Larry as an anti-social personality. Levin claimed kicking out members broke up their group.

== Discography ==
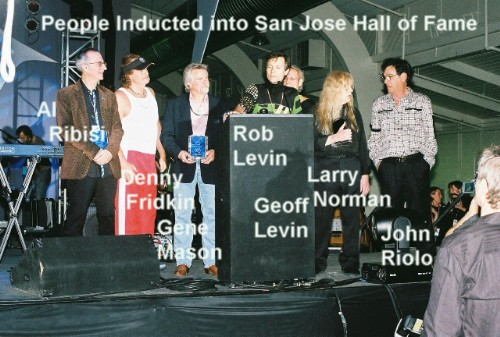
People! at installation into San Jose Rocks! Hall of Fame in 2007

=== Singles (45 rpm) ===
Title (A Side/B Side) (Label Number) Year

- "Organ Grinder"/"Riding High" (Capitol 5920) 1967
- "I Love You"/"Somebody Tell Me My Name" (Capitol 2078) 1968 US No. 14
- "Apple Cider"/Ashes of Me (Capitol 2251) 1968 US No. 111
- "Ulla"/Turnin' Me In (Capitol 2449) 1969 US No. 129*
- "Turnin' Me In"/Ulla (Capitol 2499) 1969
- "Love Will Take Us Higher & Higher"/"Living It Up" (Paramount 0005) 1969
- "Sunshine Lady"/"Crosstown Bus" (Paramount 0011) 1969
- "For What It's Worth"/"Maple Street" (Paramount 0019) 1970
- "One Chain Don't Make No Prison"/"Keep It Alive" (Paramount 0028) 1970
- "Chant for Peace"/"I Don't Carry No Guns" (Polydor 14087) 1971
- "I Love You" (re-issue)/"Nobody but Me" (the Human Beinz) (Capitol P4482 and X-6224)

US Chart is Billboard unless otherwise noted. * Record World singles chart.

=== Albums ===
- I Love You (1968) (Capitol ST-2924) CD re-release (1994) (Capitol CDP-29797)
- Both Sides of People (1969) (Capitol ST-151)
- There Are People and There Are People (1970) (Paramount PAS-5013)
- Larry Norman and People! - The Israel Tapes 1974 A.D. (1980)
- Best of People Vol. 1 - 40 Year Anniversary (2006) (Solid Rock CD-SRP-001)
- Best of People Vol. 2 - 40 Year Anniversary (2006) (Solid Rock CD-SRP-002)
- People! The Reunion Concert 2006 (2007) (Solid Rock)
- I Love You Korea (2007) (Solid Rock ILY-001)

== Video interviews ==
- "The Jerry Bovino Show - Rock and Roll Brothers with Robbie Levin, Geoff Levin, and Host Jerry Bovino" 2017
