= Society of Illustrators of Los Angeles =

Professional organization

The Society of Illustrators of Los Angeles
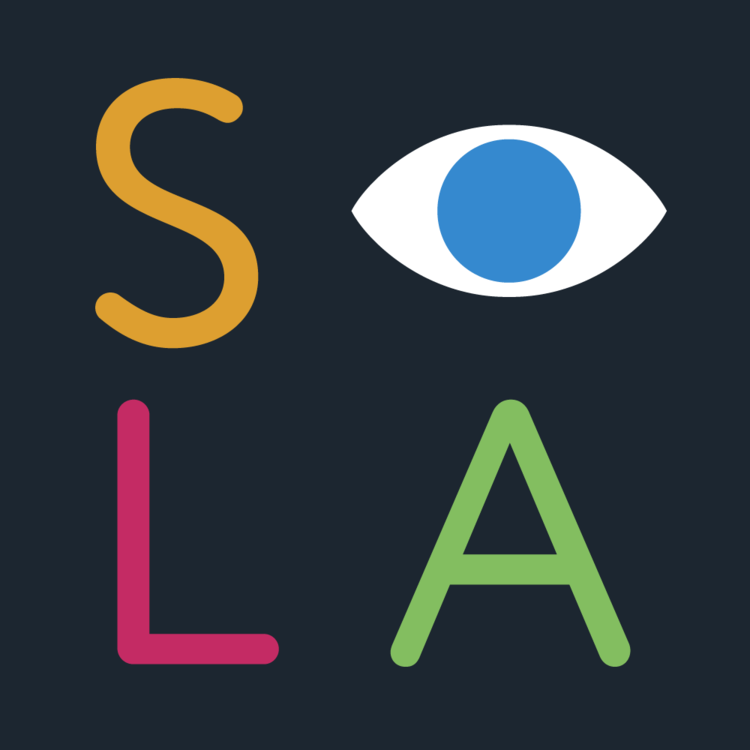
- Formation: February 1, 1953; 73 years ago
- Founder: Reynold Brown, Joseph Henninger, Jacques Kapralik, Bill Tara, Harry Diamond, Karl Hubenthal, Harold Kramer, Ren Wicks, Scott Eidson, Jim Jonson, Si Meserow, and Gene Widhoff
- Purpose: Promote the professional status of illustration art as well as foster both philanthropic and educational goals.
- Location: Los Angeles, California
- Fields: Illustration
- President: Joe Cepeda (2018-present)
- Website: www.si-la.org

The Society of Illustrators of Los Angeles (SILA) was founded in 1953 by a group of Southern California artists and designers "...to promote the professional status of illustration art as well as foster both philanthropic and educational goals".

== History ==
=== Founding ===
In the spring of 1953 a group of leading Southern California Illustrators got together in a meeting room at the Statler Hotel (now the downtown Hilton) to discuss the possibility of forming a professional artists club. The group at the Statler Hotel was composed of L.A.’s most talented illustrators and included Joseph Morgan Henninger, Fritz Willis, George Sheppard, Jacques Kapralik, Bill Tara, Reynold Brown, Ken Sawyer, and others. There were thirteen in all and they began to lead the mushrooming of major art and illustration in Southern California. By the beginning of World War II huge demands by defense and aircraft companies had lured other fine illustrators from all over the nation and suddenly the “cultural desert” had blossomed into a first class art market. Membership in SILA had swollen to over one hundred and, together with the Los Angeles Art Directors Club, the two organizations drew speakers from New York and Chicago to their programs and they both sponsored top quality shows every year.

=== USAF ===
The Society maintains an association with the United States Air Force (USAF) whereby members may contribute appropriate art to the USAF Art Collection. Contributing artists are flown at government expense to a show of their works and receive awards for their contributions. The artists retain copyright to their works. One memorable trip took place during the last USO show in 1957 when twelve SILA members flew to Europe and did 2200 portrait sketches of military personnel in post war occupation bases.

In 1961, the USAF requested, via the Society, several Disney artists Claude Coats, Al Dempster and Art Riley to participate in the program.

The Society supports an active blog to keep members informed and conducts classes and workshops at Pop Secret Gallery.

=== Illustration West ===
The Society hosts Illustration West, an annual illustration competition and exhibition open to illustrators around the world with Gold, Silver and Bronze awarded individually in several different categories: Advertising; Book; Cartoon; Children's Market; Editorial; Entertainment & Visual Development; Gallery; Graphic Novels and Comic Books; Institutional; Student; and Unpublished and Self Promotional Category. Scholarships are presented to the Gold, Silver and Bronze Award winners from the Student category. A panel of other well known artists and art directors conduct the judging. The top annual award, named after the first president of SILA, is the "Joseph Morgan Henninger Award". An additional award presented is the "Patrick Nagel Award for Excellence". Over 1,100 entries spanning the globe were received for the 2020 competition.

== Presidents ==
As of 2021, the president of the Society of Illustrators of Los Angeles is Joe Cepeda.

Notable past presidents of the Society:

- Joseph Morgan Henninger (1953) — founding member
- Karl Hubenthal (1959) — founding member
- Leo Monahan (1966, 1980–1981)
- Don Weller (1967)
- Ren Wicks (1956, 1977) — founding member
- Mike Machat (1983)
- Bobbie Moline-Kramer (1988)
- Keri Rosebraugh (2003-2004)
