= Jimmie Spheeris =

American singer-songwriter (1949–1984)

- Spheeris, c. 1972

Background information
- Born: Jimmie Andrew Spheeris; November 5, 1949
- Origin: Phenix City, Alabama, U.S.
- Died: July 4, 1984 (aged 34)
- Genres: Jazz; rock; jazz-rock fusion; folk rock; new wave
- Occupations: Singer-songwriter; bandleader
- Instruments: Guitar; piano; keyboards
- Years active: 1971–1984
- Labels: Columbia; Epic

Jimmie Andrew Spheeris (November 5, 1949 – July 4, 1984) was an American singer-songwriter who released four albums in the 1970s on the Columbia Records and Epic Records labels. Spheeris died in 1984, at the age of 34, after a motorcycle accident.

== Biography ==
Jimmie Andrew Spheeris was born in Phenix City, Alabama, to Juanita 'Gypsy' (née Gary) and Andrew 'Curley' Spheeris, who owned and operated a traveling carnival called the Majick Empire. These childhood years of colorful transience were a major influence on later work, as evidenced in songs such as "Lost in the Midway" and "Decatur Street", among others.

Spheeris had two sisters, Penelope and Linda, and a brother, Andy. After his father was murdered by a "belligerent carnival-goer," Gypsy Spheeris moved the family to San Diego, California. The family eventually settled in Venice, California. Gypsy Spheeris tended bar at an establishment on Main Street called The Circle.

Spheeris had a son with Idalie Adams, James Zeus Adams, who died in 2022. Adams was a former musician, who was once the lead singer of a local band, SOS, that frequently played in the Cape Region in Delaware.

== Career ==
Spheeris moved to New York City in the late 1960s to pursue his songwriting career. The liner notes on his debut album credit friend and fellow songwriter Richie Havens, who introduced Spheeris to Columbia Records executive Clive Davis. Davis signed Spheeris to a four album recording contract and his debut album was released on the Columbia label.

Spheeris' 1971 debut album, Isle of View, garnered a devoted following and FM radio airplay, most notably for the song "I Am the Mercury." His 1973 album, The Original Tap Dancing Kid, was followed by a period of extensive concert touring. Spheeris returned to the recording studio in 1975 with The Dragon is Dancing and released Ports of the Heart in 1976. After Ports of the Heart, Spheeris had no recording contract. Except for a 1980 single, "Hold Tight," Spheeris released no new material through a major record label.

Spheeris died at the age of 34 in Santa Monica, California, when his motorcycle collided with a van at 2 a.m. on the morning of July 4, 1984. The driver of the van, Bruce Burnside, was charged with driving under the influence of alcohol and felony vehicular manslaughter. Hours before his death, Spheeris finished the self-titled album, Spheeris, which was produced by Paul Delph. This final album was not publicly released for 16 years. Delph would later record two of Spheeris' songs for his final album A God That Can Dance.

A song on Spheeris' final album entitled "You Must Be Laughing Somewhere" is based on the life of his friend, author John Kennedy Toole (whose novel, A Confederacy of Dunces, was posthumously awarded the Pulitzer Prize for Fiction in 1981).

In 1998, independent record label Rain Records began re-releasing Spheeris' catalog on CD, but stopped production in 2001 following the cancellation of a music licensing contract with Sony Music Special Products (owner of Spheeris’ catalog).

== Style ==
Jimmie Spheeris, c. 1976

Spheeris primarily composed on the guitar and piano. His musical genre was generally in the folk music and singer-songwriter traditions, although later work explored jazz, rock music, jazz-rock fusion and new wave music.

With few exceptions, Spheeris’ guitar compositions employed the use of open tunings, also referred to as alternate tunings. Johnny Pierce (November 30, 1953 – December 12, 2005), worked with Spheeris as a recording session and touring artist from 1973 to 1980, and wrote extensive guitar tablature regarding the tunings Spheeris used throughout his career.

Spheeris’ vocal range was primarily baritone and tenor, with occasional falsetto flourishes. His voice is most often described by music critics and fans as "soulful," "sultry," or "smoky."

== Musicians ==
Longtime friend Jackson Browne contributed backing vocals on Spheeris' 1976 album, Ports of the Heart. Recording artist Laura Nyro and Spheeris were also friends, sharing a New York City apartment for a time in the early 1970s.

The following is a partial list of musicians who contributed to recordings by Jimmie Spheeris:

Jane Getz, John Goodsall, Dwight David Evans, David Campbell, Geoff Levin, Lee Calvin Nicolai, David Harowitz, Emile Latimer, Buddy Salzman, Bill La Vorna, Felix Cavaliere, Russ Kunkel, Leland Sklar, Bobbye Hall, Sneaky Pete Kleinow, Doreen Davis, Vinnie Johnson, John Summers, Jim Cowger, Harvey Mason, Norma Trotter, Charlie Larky, Bart Hall, Johnny Pierce, Chick Corea, Mike Mallen, Paul Lewinson, Dorothy Remsen, Henry Lewy, Morgan Ames, Chuck Findley, Robert Findley, Gary Barone, Mike Anglin, Jonathan Ellis, Stanley Clarke, John Guerin, Jay Ellington Lee, Robin Williamson, Dan Orbach, Emile Pandolfi, Richard Feves, Paul Delph, Rick Parnell, Doug Lunn, Paul Lani, Richard Burmer, Paul Marcus, Charlotte Crossley, Peter Udo, Vida Vierra, Fred Rehfeld, Terry Powers, Lavell Gibson, Michael Stewart, Arnold McUlla, Bo Tanas

== Personal life ==
Spheeris was gay.

== Discography ==
- Isle of View, 1971, Columbia 30988. Produced by Paul Leka.
- The Original Tap Dancing Kid, 1973, Columbia 32157. Produced by Felix Cavaliere.
- The Dragon is Dancing, 1975, Epic 33565. Produced by Henry Lewy.
- Ports of the Heart, 1976, Epic 34276. Produced by David Campbell.
- An Evening with Jimmie Spheeris (live), 1999, Rain Records RR005. Produced by Johnny Pierce.
- Spheeris, 2000, Rain Records RR006. Produced by Paul Delph.
