= Mike Machat =

Artist, aviator, and former NSA agent

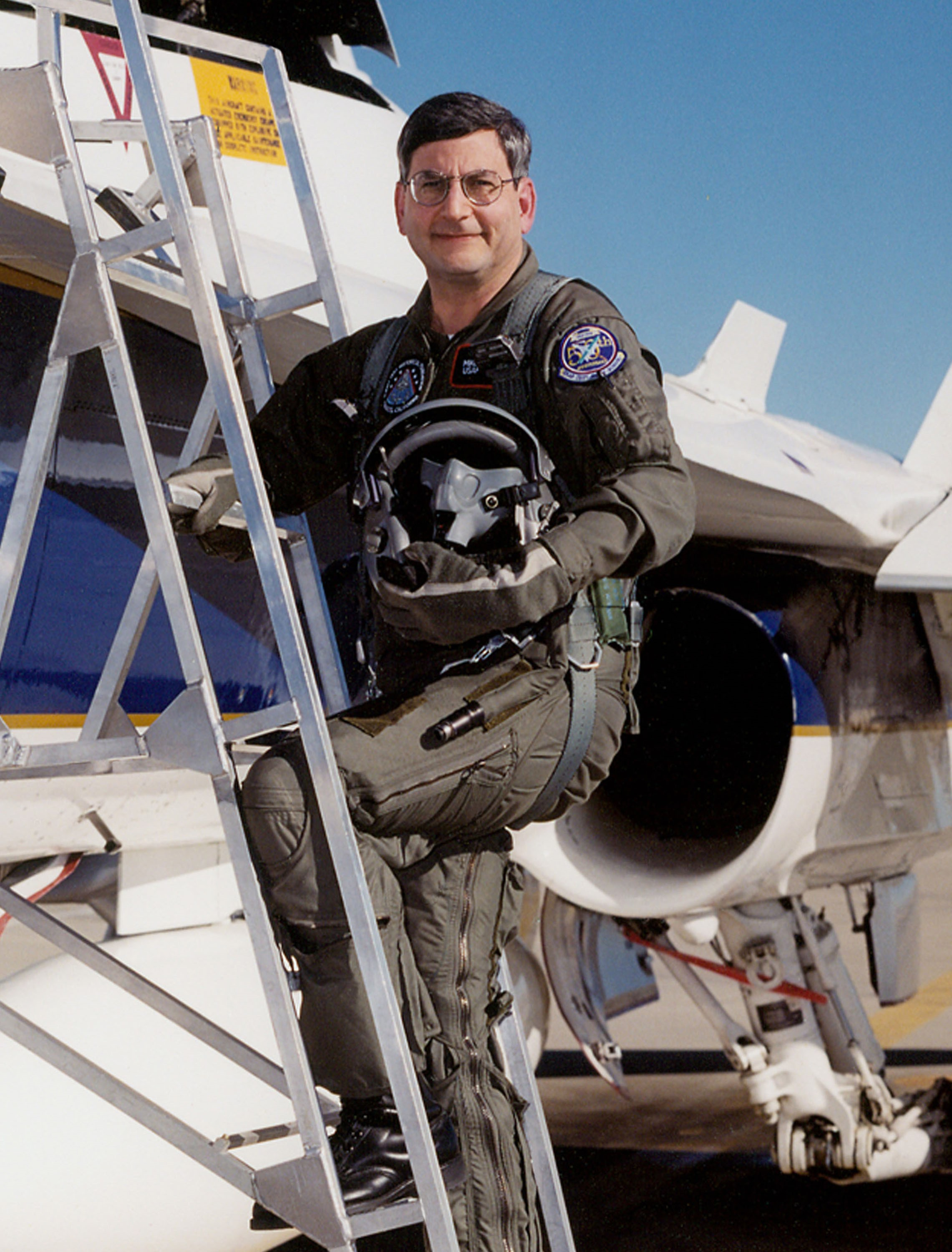
- Born: Long Island, New York
- Education: California State University, Long Beach
- Occupations: Pilot, author, and artist

Michael J. Machat is an American artist, author, and pilot. He specializes in aviation art and was a frequent collaborator of R.E.G. Davies on the book series An Airline and its Aircraft. Several aviation museums have permanent collections of Machat's art.

== Biography ==
Machat grew up in Long Island, New York. He would visit New York airports and draw airplanes as a kid. Machat began flying at age 16, exchanging his drawings and paintings for flying lessons. Although poor eyesight prevented Machat from commercial flying, he would eventually fly in more than 200 aircraft, including with the U.S. Air Force Test Pilot School, the Blue Angels, and NASA.

He attended Pratt Institute from 1965 to 1966, then served in the United States Air Force from 1967 to 1970 as an airman. Machat relocated to Los Angeles, California, where he graduated from California State University, Long Beach in 1979. Machat then began working at the Douglas Aircraft Company as a Staff Artist and Corporate Representative.

In 1984, Machat established his own aviation art studio. He was later elected as the first president of the American Society of Aviation Artists and was made a member of the Society of Illustrators, both of New York City and of Los Angeles. Machat previously served as president of Society of Illustrators of Los Angeles.

== Art ==
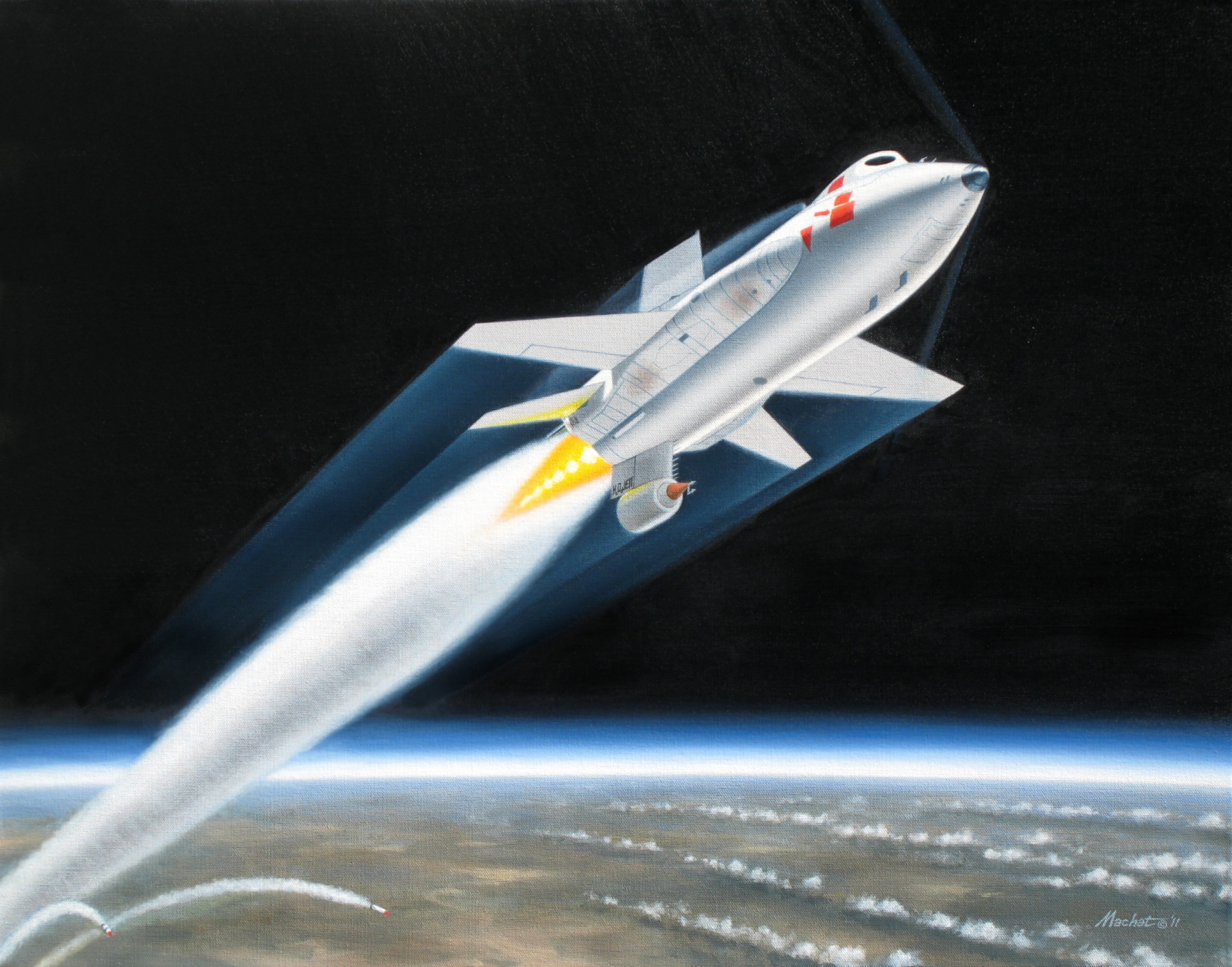
Machat's painting honoring the world speed record flight of the North American X-15A-2 flown by the late Colonel Pete Knight

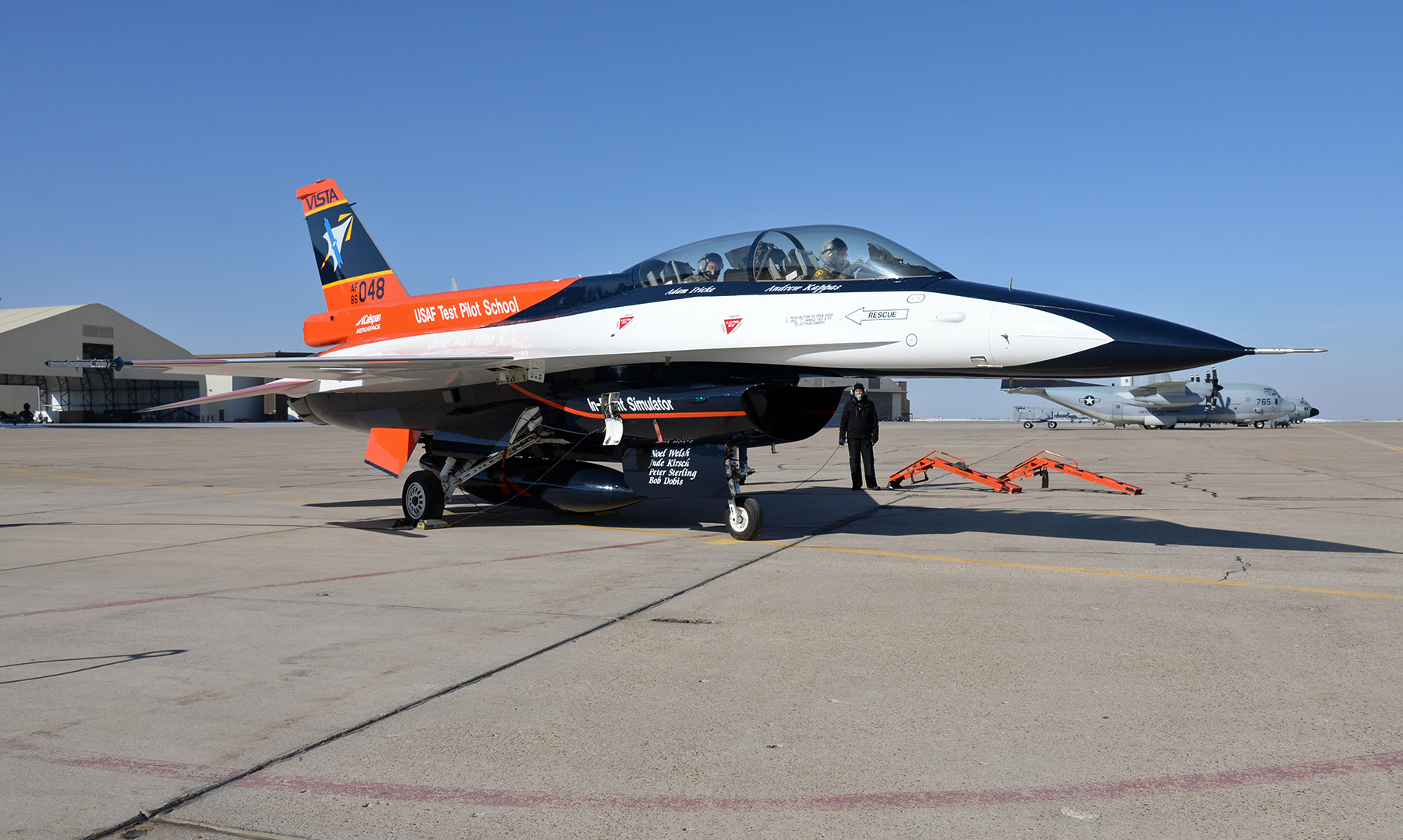
The General Dynamics NF-16D VISTA in 2019 after receiving a new paint scheme designed by Machat

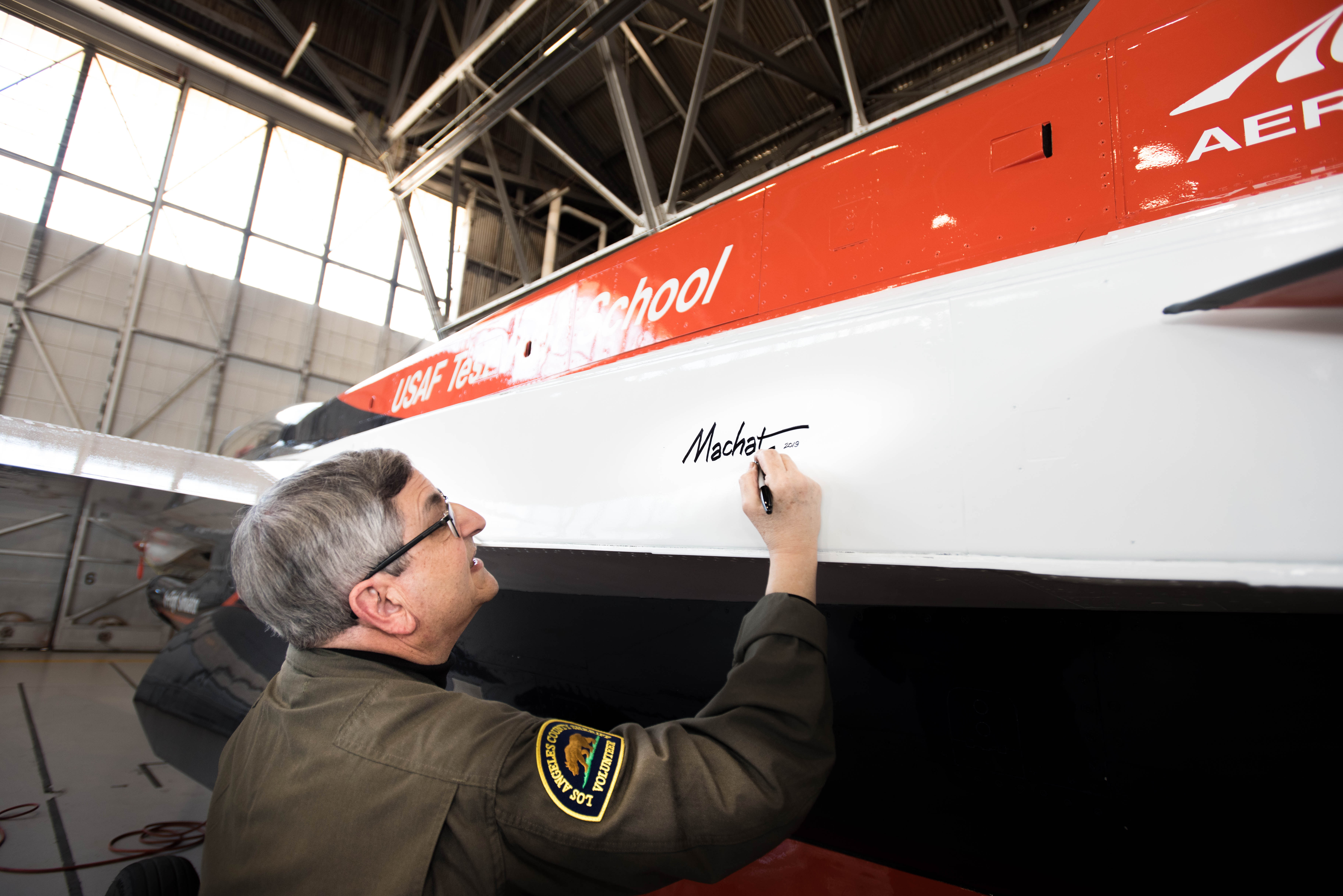
Mike Machat personally signs the NF-16D for the U.S. Air Force Test Pilot School in March 2019

Machat created a 6 by 21 feet (1.8 m × 6.4 m) mural of the P-38 for the Burbank Airport in 1996. One of Machat's drawings hangs on a wall at Bob Hope Airport in Burbank, California. Another, titled February 17, 1986, is owned by the Smithsonian National Air and Space Museum. Machat has also painted for the U.S. Air Force, where he once served on active duty. Machat painted a 10 by 20 feet (3.0 m × 6.1 m) mural titled The Golden Age of Flight for the Air Force Flight Test Center Museum. In 2012, Machat was selected to restore a painting by Douglas Ettridge of an Lockheed NF-104A at the Air Force Test Pilot School.

Machat was awarded the 11th Annual Combs Gates Award by the National Aviation Hall of Fame in 2013 for his mural, Fly DOUGLAS! In 2014, Machat completed a 10 by 20 feet (3.0 m × 6.1 m) mural, Flying Navy, for the Museum of Flying in Santa Monica, CA.

The Smithsonian National Air and Space Museum (District of Columbia), National Soaring Museum (Elmira, New York), and the National Museum of Naval Aviation (Pensacola, FL) have Machat's artwork in their permanent collections. Machat hosts a series of shows at the Museum of Flying, which began on June 8, 2019. He painted the mural Record Breakers for the museum and serves as curator at this museum.

== Books ==
Machat illustrated a number of books by R. E. G. Davies, including:

- Aeroflot
- Pan Am
- Delta
- Lufthansa
- TWA
- Trans Brasil
- Charles Lindbergh: An Airman, His Aircraft, and His Great Flights

He also authored several books, such as:

- Painting Aviation's Legends
- World's Fastest Four-engine Piston-powered Aircraft
