= A God That Can Dance =

Studio album by Paul Delph
- Released: 1996 (private release); 2003 (official release)
- Genres: Pop, rock
- Length: 57:23
- Labels: Search & Seizure Records
- Producers: Paul Delph, Paul Marcus

Paul Delph chronology
Release (1992)	A God That Can Dance (1996)

A God That Can Dance is the second and final studio album from Los Angeles-based musician Paul Delph, released privately in 1996 and officially in 2003.

== Background ==
A God That Can Dance was privately released to family and friends in 1996. It chronicles Delph's struggle with HIV/AIDS and draws its title from a quote attributed in the liner notes to Friedrich Nietzsche (1844 – 1900):

"I would believe only in a God that knew how to dance." — Thus Spoke Zarathustra

== Writing and recording ==
The album was produced by Delph and Paul Marcus, who also wrote the majority of the material together. The album was engineered by Delph and Jim McMahon. It was recorded at Magic Bus Studio, Magic Studio, and The Aspen Studio, and mastered by Wally Traugott at Capitol Studios, California.

Both "Eternity Spin" and "The Dance at the End of Time" was written by American singer-songwriter Jimmie Spheeris. In 1983–4, he returned to the studio to record a new album that was produced by Delph, however he was killed by a drunken driver in 1984. The album, titled Spheeris, wasn't released commercially until 2000. In "Mad at God", the second verse speaks of Spheeris, where Delph questions whether his "best friend had to die", relating to the fatal motorcycle crash Spheeris was involved with. "Breath of Life" features vocal from singer and friend Vida Vierra. "Mama Don't Cry" is directed to Delph's parents. "Kyrie" was written by Medieval French poet and composer Guillaume de Machaut. "Let Yourself Go" was later used in the final scene of the 1999 US romantic comedy film Deal of a Lifetime.

In 2003, to promote the release of the album, a radio broadcast on KOOP FM 91.7 in Austin, Texas, featured album personnel Paul Marcus, Vida Vierra, Doug Lunn and Andy Markley. Marcus commented: "Paul and I worked closely on the album, we'd been writing songs for about fifteen years, and he found out he was HIV positive and then finally told me. Slowly but surely we started writing these songs that were sort of a song cycle, and we didn't really realise that until about half way through, but it was basically documenting what he went through and what we were going through. It was very exciting, incredibly sad, and always powerful - what had happened - all the recording that went on during the sessions. Most of it happened in this Magic Bus, somebody had left a 24-track recording studio on a bus in Malibu, and said Paul, here you can use this." Recalling "Mama Don't Cry", Marcus said: "I remember when he wrote "Mama Don't Cry", it came out of a conversation where I said 'you gotta tell your folks, you've got to tell them', if he wanted to protect them as he's a sweet guy who doesn't want anyone to hurt. And he did, and one of his ways of telling his mother was to write the song."

Three days after Delph's death, his mother, June, published a letter based on Paul's final week. She said: "Throughout the week, we played music for Paul - "A God That Can Dance," and in particular, "Breath of Life," also Jimmie Spheeris' CD that Paul put together of Jimmie's renditions of favorite songs."

== Official release ==
Growing interest in Delph's legacy later caused the album to be officially released on CD in 2003. It was digitally remastered and featured new artwork designed by Billy Vaughn, with inserts containing all the lyrics, credits and updated biography information. All sales of the album were to benefit the Paul Delph Memorial Scholarship Fund. After the album's release, five additional Paul Delph collections were to follow, but these have not yet appeared.

Marcus said of the release: "It just had to be done, it's astonishing work, it's an amazing album. There's an incredible lineup of musicians, the material is just stunning, it was languishing and it needed to be documented, preserved and made available to a new generation of listeners."

== Track listing ==
No.	Title	Writer(s)	Length
1.	"Mad at God"	Paul Delph, Paul Marcus	4:54
2.	"The Good Days are Better (But the Bad Days are Worse)"	Delph, Marcus	4:21
3.	"Mamma Don't Cry"	Delph, Marcus	5:18
4.	"Sombadine"	Delph	1:54
5.	"Stumbling in the Dark"	Delph, Marcus	4:44
6.	"More than Ever"	Delph, Marcus	4:47
7.	"Let Yourself Go"	Delph	4:26
8.	"I'm Gonna Save My Dreams until Tomorrow"	Delph	3:11
9.	"Kyrie"	Guillaume de Machaut	1:31
10.	"Eternity Spin"	Jimmie Spheeris	4:43
11.	"My Heaven"	Delph, Marcus	4:31
12.	"A God That Can Dance"	Delph, Marcus	3:45
13.	"Breath of Life"	Delph, Marcus	7:41
14.	"The Dance at the End of Time"	Spheeris	1:29

== Critical reception ==
Professional ratings
Review scores
Source	Rating
AllMusic	5/5 stars
David McClanahan	(A++)

Will Grega of AllMusic said:

"A God That Can Dance takes the big view. Dealing with the struggle to survive in a surprisingly upbeat and life-affirming fashion, this triumphant disc is the best example yet that in facing death, one can also confront the larger issues of life and ultimately find peace. The result is a masterful album about immortality at once intensely personal, yet broad in its sheer pop appeal. A mix of prayerful, comforting ballads and rockers dealing with tragedy, surrender, rescue and the Great Unknown, A God That Can Dance is a testament to faith in eternal life, a look past suffering, and an embracing of the infinite. Delph has created some of the most upbeat, positive, life-affirming and spiritual rock music you may ever hear. Songs dealing with anger, sorrow, and finding strength lead to a poetic and otherworldly, new age-style climax with the pensive album closers "Breath of Life" and "The Dance at the End of Time." Delph makes death into a beautiful thing by removing the fear and replacing it with faith and hope. It's a remarkable journey for modern ears and hearts."

David McClanahan wrote:

"This is a powerful, deeply moving CD that will have you singing, smiling and dancing; it will also bring tears to your eyes, and cherishment to your heart. A God That Can Dance is a wonderful, unique CD bridging a wide range of styles, textures and emotions. Listening to this CD is like walking through a huge tapestry, a sonic landscape that covers the entire range of human experience. There are songs that are a dancing celebration of life, full of joy and often ecstatic. Other songs are hard rocking, intensely angry, questioning, seeking answers to the painful, horrific events of the human experience. There are songs expressing the deepest feelings of love, gratitude and the cherishment of life. Moments that are mystical, pensive, etheric, timeless. There are moments that are deeply touching and many of great beauty. Overall, the message is a positive, uplifting hymn of hope and a deep belief in Immortality. Written and recorded when Paul knew he was dying of AIDS; the lyrics are profound, the music is nothing short of genius, the resulting feeling is one of hope, faith, love and the cherishment of a life where Paul could make such music for a God that can dance."

== Personnel ==
- Paul Delph - vocals, keyboards, producer, engineer
- Paul Marcus - guitar, keyboards, backing vocals, producer
- John Goodsall, Rick Blair, Dave Fisk, Jonathan McEuen - guitar
- Doug Lunn - bass
- Doug Webb - saxophone
- David Mendez - percussion
- MeHi Manoliu - clay pot
- Vida Vierra - backing vocals
- Andy Markley - sampled vocals, art direction, digital imaging
- Jim McMahon - engineer
- Wally Traugott - mastering
- Billy Vaughn - cover photo
- Lee Varis - inner sleeve photo
- WCB Graphics (Bill Beckman and Jim Long) - graphic support
