= Isle of View (Jimmie Spheeris album) =

Studio album by Jimmie Spheeris
- Released: 1971
- Studio: Columbia
- Genre: Rock
- Length: 39:46
- Label: Columbia
- Producer: Paul Leka

Jimmie Spheeris chronology
Isle of View (1971)	The Original Tap Dancing Kid (1973)

Isle of View is an album by American singer-songwriter Jimmie Spheeris. It was his debut album and was released in 1971 by Columbia Records. The album did not have any success on the charts, but it was an FM radio hit, and through it Spheeris developed a cult following.

== Background ==
Spheeris wrote the lyrics for the album while his was staying with his friend Richie Havens, in his West Village apartment. Spheeris recalled that it was a "very magical time" for him. He said "an awkward line between innocence and the world's sleaziest ways was drawn and I seemed to hang delicately between the two". He went on to say that the songs were primarily based on his "struggle for freedom, and they were dreams".

His former bass player, Johnny Pierce said Clive Davis discovered Spheeris when he was 22 years old. He says during that period in the music industry, "it was like there was this huge door open, almost like a renaissance happening musically, and all different kinds of artists were allowed to come in". American journalist Liane Hansen noted how his debut album received a significant amount of FM radio airplay; she said that "in the early '70s, that's when FM radio was coming up and it was free form. I mean, what one heard on the radio actually reflected often the tastes of the person who happened to have the shift".

== Release ==
The album was originally released on vinyl in 1971 by Columbia Records, and had a re-release on CD in March 1998. Johnny Pierce who was behind the CD release, said he kept waiting for Spheeris' catalog of records to be released, but when he called Sony Records, who had acquired the rights, they told him "they had no plans to ever release them". When Pierce finally got the green light after eight months of negotiations, he ended up taking out a mortgage on his house, and started Rain Records so he could do the project himself. When the distributor K-tel went bankrupt, Sony canceled its licensing agreement with Rain, and they were no longer allowed to manufacture or sell anymore CDs. According to Goldmine Magazine, the Isle of View CD "routinely brings $100 and more on the second-hand market".

== Artwork ==
External image
- via The Internet Archive
- Originally planned artwork by Ingo Swann with Spheeris rising out of the sea, with his side pierced and a rainbow coming out of the wound.

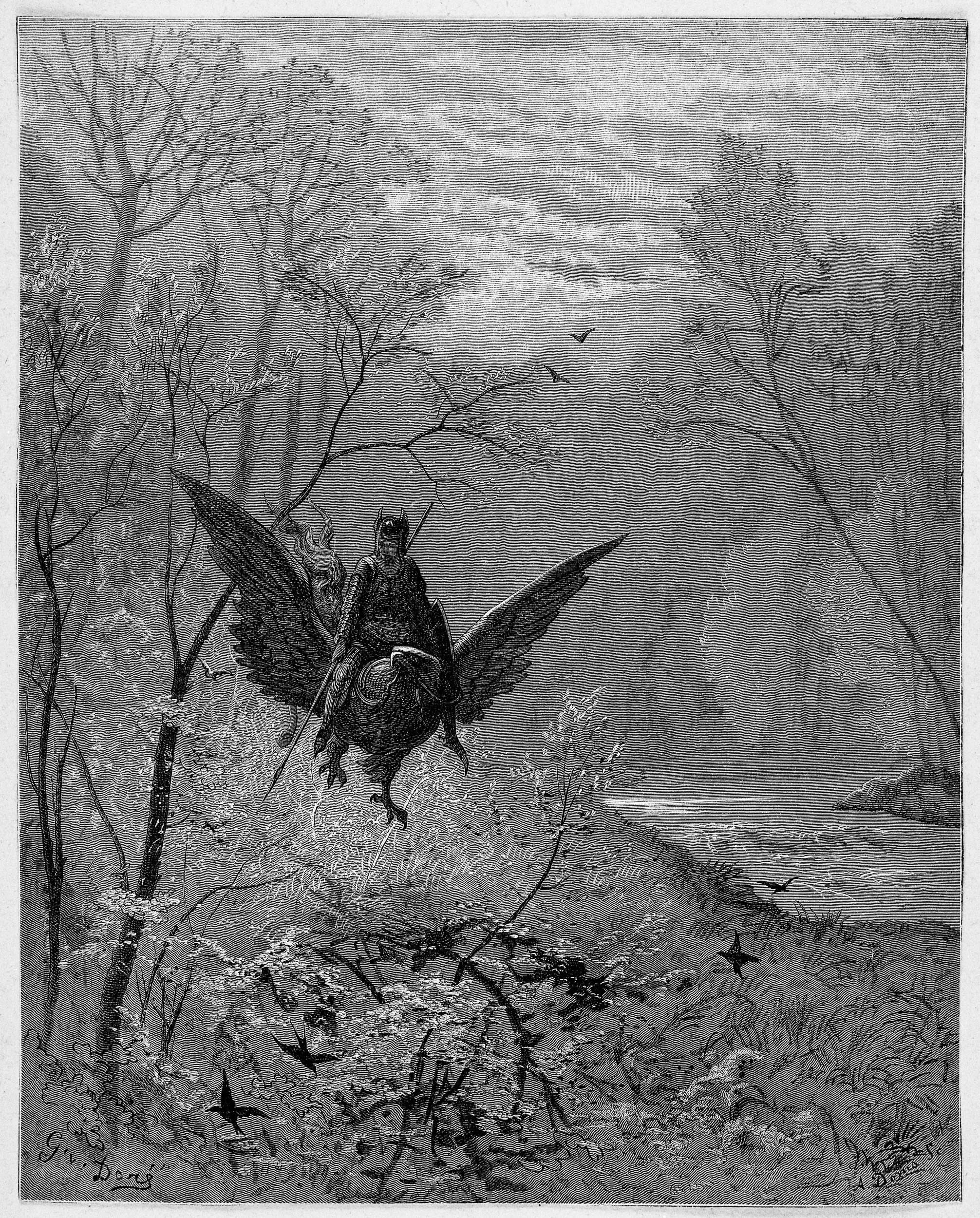
Illustration by Gustave Doré from Ludovico Ariosto's Orlando Furioso, which became the album cover.

When Spheeris first started working on the album, he initially commissioned American artist Ingo Swann to paint a cover for the album. His vision for the cover was for Swann to "paint him rising out of the sea by an island, and to paint him with his side pierced and a rainbow coming out of the wound".

However, before Swann could finish the painting, Spheeris had visited an antique store and bought a picture that he then decided would be the album cover. That picture was by the French artist Gustave Doré, who in 1877 illustrated the British and French editions of the sixteenth-century poem Orlando Furioso by Ludovico Ariosto.

Spheeris eventually gave the original artwork by Swann to Idalie Adams, the mother of their son, and she then gave it to their son, James Zeus Adams. American photographer David Gahr is credited for the back cover photo of Spheeris.

== Reception ==
Music critic Tom Moon wrote that "the album has much to recommend it, stirring little songs about nature and assorted phantasmagoria like 'I Am the Mercury', the slow-motion plea 'Come Back', and the gorgeous and unconventional string writing from Beck's dad David Campbell". Billboard Magazine stated that Spheeris has "crafted an album that provides an unique emotional exchange between artist and listener. His lyrics are quietly mystical and his images intensely personal. The whole album is suffused in an atmosphere of becalming mellowness".

Sandi Davis wrote in The Daily Oklahoman that the album is "lush, full-bodied ... and for baby boomers, this album will bring back those lingering days in the early 1970s when there was time for everything ... every cut will bring a grin of remembrance, or a smile of discovery". Robert Butler wrote in The Kansas City Star, that the album "might have been called 'Songs from Middle Earth'. It contains soft, mellow music that wove a kind of fairytale tapestry and the cover featured an etching of an armored warrior flying on the back of a giant eagle, and that feeling of otherworldliness permeated the music with its subtle mixture of fantasy and mysticism". Thomas Conner wrote in Tulsa World that "nature is a recurring metaphor on his 1971 debut album, and it's a dewy scene filled with nymphs, love and Cheshire grins".

Tim Smith of Midlake opined that "it's kind of otherworldly. I mean, there are a lot of singer-songwriters who play mellow folk-rock, but there's something about this. The album is rather soft-sounding with pianos, flutes and acoustic guitars throughout. Its a very beautiful and magical album and, in my opinion, perfect". Alex Henderson from AllMusic wrote that while "it was hardly a big seller, it did earn Spheeris a small but extremely devoted cult following ... acoustic-oriented selections like 'I Am the Mercury', 'For Roach', and 'The Nest' are superb – when you aren't admiring Spheeris for being such an expressive, charismatic vocalist, you're loving his way with words".

== Track listing ==
All tracks are written by Jimmie Spheeris, except for "Long Way Down", written by Lee Calvin Nicoli.

Side A
No.	Title	Length
1.	"The Nest"	4:00
2.	"For Roach"	2:45
3.	"Monte Luna"	3:01
4.	"Seeds Of Spring"	3:52
5.	"I Am The Mercury"	4:58

Side B
No.	Title	Length
1.	"Long Way Down"	4:36
2.	"Let It Flow"	3:20
3.	"Seven Virgins"	2:56
4.	"Come Back"	4:30
5.	"Esmaria"	5:48
Total length:		39:46

== Personnel ==
- Jimmie Spheeris – Guitar, piano, vocals
- Geoff Levin – Guitar
- David Campbell – Violin, viola
- Lee Calvin Nicolai – Flute, bass, guitar, backing vocals
- David Harowitz – Piano On "Monte Luna" and tracks 6–10
- Emil Latimer – Conga
- Buddy Salzman – Drums
- Bill La Vornia – Drums
- Strings arranged and conducted by David Campbell

== See also ==
- Jimmie Spheeris discography
