= Jacques Kapralik =

American cartoonist

- Born: October 29, 1906; Bucharest, Romania
- Died: November 28, 1960 (aged 54); Los Angeles, California, United States

Jacques Kapralik (1906–1960) was a Romanian American caricaturist best remembered for his work with MGM in the 1940s.

Born in Bucharest, Romania, Kapralik came to the United States in 1936. He specialized in designing miniature models resembling film stars, which were then photographed against backgrounds giving a three-dimensional effect.

Although Kapralik's work occasionally appeared onscreen in films such as Presenting Lily Mars, most of his output was devoted to publicity materials in trade magazine ads and press kits.

In 1953, Kapralik was one of the founders of the Society of Illustrators of Los Angeles.

Kapralik died in 1960, in Los Angeles, California.
