= Karl Hubenthal =

American cartoonist

- Born: May 1, 1917 Beemer, Nebraska
- Died: August 13, 1998 (aged 81) Los Angeles, California
- Areas: Editorial; Sports
- Awards: Inkpot Award

Karl Hubenthal (1917–1998) was an American cartoonist who did both editorial and sports cartoons.

== Biography ==
Hubenthal (known as "Hubie") attended both Hollywood High School (class of 1935) and Chouinard Art School, now Chouinard Art Institute, in Los Angeles. Hubenthal got his first job in the Art Department of the Los Angeles Herald-Express, the same year he graduated from high school. A few years later, Hubenthal began drawing a weekly sports cartoons. Eventually, Hubenthal left to serve in the Marine Corps during World War II.

== Career ==
Following the war Hubenthal worked as a freelancer, focusing on advertisements. By 1949, he went back to cartooning at another Hearst publication, the Los Angeles Examiner. He became the Examiner's full-time editorial cartoonist in 1956. In 1961, he designed the helmet, uniforms, and original Norseman logo for the Minnesota Vikings on behalf of new Vikings general manager Bert Rose and head coach Norm Van Brocklin, who he had known when they were with the Los Angeles Rams. When his former publication, the Herald-Express was combined with the Examiner in 1962 Hubenthal's cartoons were carried over to the new publication (the Herald-Examiner). While Hubenthal's work was also in syndication to other Hearst publications and he was also continued to draw sports cartoons and other pieces of sports-themed art. Hubenthal's work was distributed nationally by Hearst's publications for over 30 years. He retired from the Herald-Examiner in 1982. He was a founding member and served as president of the Society of Illustrators of Los Angeles, President of the American Association of Editorial Cartoonists, and Regional Director of the National Cartoonists Society. He died of cancer in 1998.

== Awards ==
With a newspaper career that spanned 47 years, Hubenthal won 25 Freedom Foundation medals, the National Headliners Award, the Helms Foundation medal, and received five Pulitzer Prize nominations. Hubenthal also received seven awards from the National Cartoonist Society. He received the NCS Editorial Cartoon Award for 1961, 1967, and 1970, and their Sports Cartoon Award for 1971, 1979, 1980, and 1982.
