= Celestial Navigations =

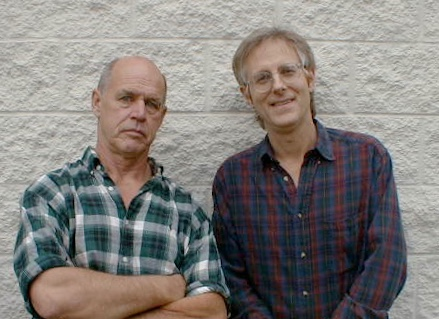
- Geoffrey Lewis and Geoff Levin

Background information
- Origin: United States
- Genres: New age music, spoken word
- Years active: 1984–2015
- Labels: Nouveau/K-Tel Records
- Past members: Geoffrey Lewis; Geoff Levin; David Campbell; Eric Zimmerman; Bettie Ross; Chris Many
- Website: http://www.celestialnavigations.com/

Celestial Navigations was an American music and story-telling group, connected to the Church of Scientology, with members Geoffrey Lewis, Geoff Levin, David Campbell, Eric Zimmerman, Bettie Ross, and Chris Many. Their performances consisted of Lewis telling a story along with electronic music to enhance the story. Lewis received a Drama-Logue Award for his performances.

== Early beginnings ==
The group was formed in 1984 and was originally known as The Great American Entertainment Show. When they performed at the Matrix Theatre in Los Angeles, Lewis won a Drama-Logue Award for his performance.

According to Lewis, he was inspired by a trip to Africa and the attention storytellers received, and therefore started to envision his own stories to tell.

Over the next two decades, the group recorded eight albums.

== Albums ==
Year released	Album	Billboard Top New Age Albums peak chart position
1988	Chapter I	
1989	Chapter II	5
1990	Celestial Navigations	14
1992	Chapter III, Ice	20
1994	Introduction	
1995	Chapter IV, Road Train	
1998	Celestial Navigations, Live At The Matrix	
2005	Chapter V, The Connection	
2006	Chapter VI, Space Racer	
2006	Romance	
2007	Chapter VII, War	
