= R. E. G. Davies =

English aviation historian (1921–2011)

- Born: July 21, 1921
- Died: July 30, 2011 (aged 90)
- Occupation: Historian
- Writing career
- Subject: Aviation history

Ronald Edward George Davies (3 July 1921 – 30 July 2011) was an English writer who was a specialist in airline and air transport history, and commercial aviation economic research.

== Biography ==
Educated at Shaftesbury Grammar School, he started work in London in 1938, and was in the British Army as a territorial volunteer from 1939 to 1946. He spent a year in Iceland, training for mountain and Arctic warfare, and drove his machine-gun carrier on to the beach in Normandy in 1944. According to the New York Times, Davies made his first airplane trip in 1948. Subsequently, he worked for the Ministry of Civil Aviation, British European Airways, the Bristol Aeroplane Company and de Havilland before moving to the United States in 1968 to lead market research for Douglas Aircraft. A lifelong aviation enthusiast, Davies dedicated his work to different aspects of the airline industry, including traffic forecasting, and specializing in its history. He researched airlines at the National Air and Space Museum as the Charles A. Lindbergh Chair in Aerospace History in 1981–1982.

Davies was responsible, alongside artist Mike Machat, for the book series An Airline and its Aircraft, about selected airlines' histories, including the types flown. His writing led him to found Paladwr Press, which published 38 books of classic airline histories and biographies.

Well travelled to more than a hundred countries, Davies was a member of three British Royal Societies, the Explorers Club, and others in France and Brazil. He enjoyed a 30-year career as the Curator of Air Transport at the Smithsonian Institution's National Air and Space Museum, and continued to write and publish airline history throughout that time. A member of the Washington Airline Society, he gave lectures, and provided assistance to airline researchers. His 25th book Airlines of the Jet Age: A History was published in July 2011, just before he died aged 90.

Davies retired in 2011 and returned to England, where he died in July of that year. His collection is held by the National Air and Space Museum.

== Publications ==
=== Reference works ===
- Davies, R. E. G. (1964). A History of the World's Airlines. New York: Oxford University Press.
- Davies, R. E. G. (1972). Airlines of the United States Since 1914. London: Putnam. ISBN 9780370000329.
- Davies, R. E. G. (1983). Airlines of Latin America Since 1919. London: Putnam. ISBN 9780370300498.
- Davies, R. E. G.; Quastler, I. E. (1994). Commuter Airlines of the United States. Washington, D.C.: Smithsonian Institution Press. ISBN 9781560984047.
- Davies, R. E. G. (1997). Airlines of Asia Since 1920. London: Putnam. ISBN 9780851778556.
- Davies, R. E. G. (2010). Airlines of the Jet Age: A History. Washington, D.C.: Smithsonian Institution Scholarly Press. ISBN 9780978846084.

=== Airline histories ===
- Davies, R. E. G.; Malone, Myrtle Davidson (1984). Continental Airlines: The First Fifty Years, 1934-1984. The Woodlands, Texas: Pioneer Publications.
- Davies, R. E. G. (1987). PanAm: An Airline and Its Aircraft. London: Hamlyn. ISBN 9780600556718.
- Davies, R. E. G. (1990). Delta Air Lines: An Airline and Its Aircraft. Miami, Florida: Paladwr Press. ISBN 9780962648304.
- Davies, R. E. G. (1989). Lufthansa: An Airline and Its Aircraft. New York: Orion Books. ISBN 9780517570227.
- Davies, R. E. G. (1992). Aeroflot: An Airline and Its Aircraft. Rockville, Maryland: Paladwr Press. ISBN 9780962648311.
- Davies, R. E. G. (1995). Saudi Arabian Airlines: An Airline and Its Aircraft. McLean, Virginia: Paladwr Press. ISBN 9780962648373.
- Davies, R. E. G. (1997). Transbrasil: An Airline and Its Aircraft. McLean, Virginia: Paladwr Press. ISBN 9781888962017.
- Davies, R. E. G. (2000). TWA: An Airline and Its Aircraft. McLean, Virginia: Paladwr Press. ISBN 9781888962161.
- Davies, R. E. G. (2003). Eastern Airlines: An Airline and Its Aircraft. McLean, Virginia: Paladwr Press. ISBN 9781888962192.
- Davies, R. E. G. (2005). British Airways: The Imperial Years, 1919–1939. McLean, Virginia: Paladwr Press. ISBN 9781888962246.
- Davies, R. E. G. (2008). TACA: An Airline and Its Aircraft. McLean, Virginia: Paladwr Press. ISBN 9781888962284.

=== Further books ===
- Davies, R. E. G. (1987). Rebels and Reformers of the Airways. Washington, D.C.: Smithsonian Institution Press. ISBN 9780874743548.
- Davies, R. E. G. (1994). Fallacies and Fantasies of Air Transport History. McLean, Virginia: Paladwr Press. ISBN 9780962648359.
- Davies, R. E. G. (1997). Charles Lindbergh: An Airman, His Aircraft, and His Great Flights. McLean, Virginia: Paladwr Press. ISBN 9781888962048.
- Davies, R. E. G. (1998). Supersonic (Airliner) Non-Sense: A Case Study in Applied Market Research. McLean, Virginia: Paladwr Press. ISBN 9781888962093.
- Davies, R. E. G.; Provan, John (1998). Berlin Airlift: The Effort and the Aircraft. McLean Virginia: Paladwr Press. ISBN 9781888962055.
- Davies, R. E. G.; Birtles, Philip (1999). De Havilland Comet: The World's First Jet Airliner. McLean, Virginia: Paladwr Press. ISBN 9781888962147.
- Davies, R. E. G.; Salnikov, Yuri (2005). The Chelyuskin Adventure: Exploration, Tragedy, Heroism. McLean, Virginia: Paladwr Press.
- Davies, R. E. G.; Wildenberg, Thomas (2006). Howard Hughes: An Airman, His Aircraft, and His Great Flights. McLean, Virginia: Paladwr Press. ISBN 9781888962277.
