= Jake Kerr (businessman) =

Canadian businessman

Jake Kerr CM OBC
- Born: John Custance Kerr; September 21, 1944 (age 81); Vancouver, British Columbia, Canada
- Other name: John Kerr
- Education: University of British Columbia; University of California (MBA, 1967)
- Occupation: Business executive
- Known for: Chair and CEO of Lignum
- Awards: Order of Canada; Order of British Columbia

John "Jake" Custance Kerr, CM, OBC (born September 21, 1944) is a Canadian business executive. He is the former chair and CEO of Lignum Ltd., one of Canada's largest privately held forest product companies.

Born in Vancouver, British Columbia, he received a bachelor's degree from the University of British Columbia in 1965 and an MBA from the University of California, Berkeley in 1967.

He has been a member of the board of directors of Scotiabank since 1999.

In 2002, he was made a Member of the Order of Canada "for his ability to bring together diverse interests" and for having "served as Canada's lead negotiator in international trade talks". In 1997, he was awarded the Order of British Columbia.
