= Larry McNeely =

- Born: January 3, 1948 (age 77); Lafayette, Indiana, United States
- Occupation: Instrumentalist
- Instrument(s): banjo, guitar, harmonica
- Years active: 1961–present

Larry McNeely (born January 3, 1948, in Lafayette, Indiana), is an American five-string banjo player known for his collaboration with Glen Campbell and for recording several soundtracks for different motion pictures.

== Career ==
McNeely began playing banjo in 1961. In the following years, he absorbed both Don Reno's style and melodic or chromatic style. He moved to LaFollette, Tennessee in 1965 to join the Pinnacle Mountain Boys and soon afterwards, he became a member of Roy Acuff and his Smokey Mountain Boys. Around 1967, he taught music lessons to Tom and Bill Gibson on banjo and guitar, respectively. In 1969, he joined the Glen Campbell Show as a replacement for John Hartford. About five years later, he was working with Burl Ives and later with Smothers Brothers. He formed the "Larry McNeely Trio" in 1975. In the fall of the 1970s, McNeely began his career as a studio session player for movie soundtracks. Over the years he has worked Mac Davis, Eddie Kendricks, Percy Faith and Barbara Mandrell. He became a member of "Southern Manor", a progressive bluegrass band in 1984. Within a year he was back working with Roy Acuff.

== Discography ==
- LP – Rhapsody for Banjo – Larry McNeely – Flying Fish Records, 1976.

Most of the music by McNeely on Flying Fish Records and Great Stoned Highway Pub. He includes a cover of Benny Goodman's "Slipped Disc", Fats Waller's "Honeysuckle Rose" and "Limehouse Blues"

- LP – Confederation – Larry McNeely With Geoff Levin & Jack Skinner – Sheffield Lab, 1978
- LP - Glen Campbell presents Larry McNeely - Capitol Records, Inc, ST-674, 1971

Nine (9) songs and a Medley performed by McNeely, including 3 terrific 5-string banjo tunes "Banjo Raga Number Two", "Bethe" and "Shuckin' the Corn." Reverse of album cover contains an introduction to McNeely by Glen Campbell.
