= Geoffrey Lewis (actor) =

American actor (1935–2015)

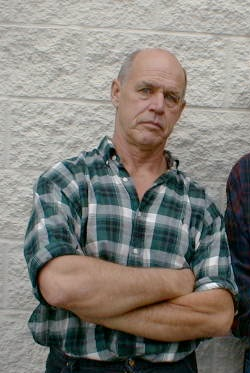
- Born: Geoffrey Bond Lewis; July 31, 1935; Plainfield, New Jersey, U.S.
- Died: April 7, 2015 (aged 79); Los Angeles, California, U.S.
- Occupation: Actor
- Years active: 1953–2015
- Spouses: Glenis Batley (m. 1973; div. 1975); Tracy Darroll (m. 1977; div. 1984); Paula Hochhalter (m. 1991)
- Children: 9, including Juliette

Geoffrey Bond Lewis (July 31, 1935 – April 7, 2015) was an American actor. He appeared in more than 200 films and television shows, and was principally known for his film roles alongside Clint Eastwood and Robert Redford. He often portrayed villains or eccentric characters.

== Life and career ==
Lewis was born July 31, 1935, in Plainfield, New Jersey, but spent much of his youth in Wrightwood, California. He studied theater arts at San Bernardino Valley College for two years, then worked as a truck driver and at other odd jobs before launching his career as an actor. He took acting classes at the Neighborhood Playhouse in New York City and performed off-Broadway and at regional theaters in Massachusetts. He tried breaking into Hollywood in the 1960s.

Lewis appeared in TV series including Bonanza, Gunsmoke, Mannix, Mission: Impossible, Cannon, Barnaby Jones, Mork & Mindy, The Golden Girls, Lou Grant, Mama's Family, Magnum, P.I., The A-Team, Titus, Murder, She Wrote, The X-Files, Little House on the Prairie, Highway to Heaven, Starsky & Hutch, Walker, Texas Ranger and Law & Order: Criminal Intent. In 1979, he appeared in Salem's Lot. He also played opposite Polly Holliday in the Alice spin-off Flo (1980–81) for which he received a Golden Globe nomination. He co-starred with Fred Dryer in Land's End (1995–96).

His film credits include such movies as Down in the Valley, The Butcher, Maverick, and When Every Day Was the Fourth of July.

Lewis worked frequently with actor-director Clint Eastwood in several films, including Midnight in the Garden of Good and Evil, Pink Cadillac, Any Which Way You Can, Bronco Billy, Every Which Way but Loose, Thunderbolt and Lightfoot, and High Plains Drifter.

In the 1980s, Lewis was also a member of musical storytelling group Celestial Navigations with musician and songwriter Geoff Levin.

== Personal life and death ==
Lewis was married three times and had numerous children, with news outlets variously reporting that he had nine or ten surviving children. One of his children is actress Juliette Lewis with whom he acted in at least two films, Blueberry and The Way of the Gun. His other children include his daughters Brandy, Hannah and Dierdre Lewis and Emily Colombier; his sons Peter, Lightfield, Miles and Matthew; and nine grandchildren.

On April 7, 2015, he died of a heart attack at age 79. He had suffered the heart attack while working out at the Motion Picture & Television Country House and Hospital, according to his family. Miles Lewis told Variety he had been suffering from Parkinson's disease and dementia.

== Selected filmography ==
| Year | Title | Role | Notes |
|---|---|---|---|
| 1963 | The Fat Black Pussycat | Man in Park | Uncredited |
| 1971 | The Todd Killings | Mr. Carpenter's son | Uncredited |
| 1971 | Welcome Home, Soldier Boys | Francis Rapture, motel owner | |
| 1972 | The Culpepper Cattle Co. | Russ | |
| 1972 | Bad Company | Hobbs | |
| 1973 | High Plains Drifter | Stacey Bridges | |
| 1973 | Dillinger | Harry Pierpont | |
| 1973 | My Name Is Nobody | Leader of the Wild Bunch | |
| 1974 | Thunderbolt and Lightfoot | Eddie Goody | |
| 1974 | Macon County Line | Hamp | |
| 1975 | The Great Waldo Pepper | Newt | |
| 1975 | The Wind and the Lion | Samuel Gummere | |
| 1975 | Smile | Wilson-Shears | |
| 1975 | Lucky Lady | Captain Mosely | |
| 1976 | The Return of a Man Called Horse | Zenas | |
| 1978 | Shoot the Sun Down | Scalphunter | |
| 1978 | Silver Saddle | 2 Strike Snake | |
| 1978 | Every Which Way but Loose | Orville Boggs | |
| 1979 | Centennial | Sheriff Bogardus | |
| 1979 | Tilt | Truck Driver | |
| 1979 | Human Experiments | Doctor Hans R. Kline | |
| 1980 | Tom Horn | Walter Stoll | |
| 1980 | Bronco Billy | John Arlington | |
| 1980 | Heaven's Gate | Trapper Fred | |
| 1980 | Any Which Way You Can | Orville Boggs | |
| 1983 | 10 to Midnight | Dave Dante | |
| 1984 | Night of the Comet | Carter | |
| 1985 | Lust in the Dust | Hard Case Williams | |
| 1985 | Stitches | Ralph Rizzo | |
| 1988 | Time Out | Mr. Steve Smith | |
| 1988 | Out of the Dark | Dennis | |
| 1989 | Fletch Lives | KKK Leader | |
| 1989 | Pink Cadillac | Ricky Z | |
| 1989 | Catch Me If You Can | Mr. Johnson | |
| 1989 | Tango & Cash | Captain Schroeder | Uncredited |
| 1990 | Disturbed | Michael Kahn | |
| 1991 | Double Impact | Frank Avery | |
| 1992 | The Lawnmower Man | Terry McKeen | |
| 1992 | Wishman | Hitchcock the Genie | |
| 1993 | Point of No Return | Drugstore Owner | |
| 1993 | Joshua Tree | Sheriff Cepeda | |
| 1993 | The Man Without a Face | Chief Wayne Stark | |
| 1993 | Only the Strong | Kerrigan | |
| 1994 | White Fang 2: Myth of the White Wolf | Heath | |
| 1994 | National Lampoon's Last Resort | Rex Carver | |
| 1994 | Maverick | Matthew Wicker / Eugene, banker | |
| 1994 | The Dragon Gate | Shin'ichi | |
| 1995 | The Janitor | Janitor | Animated short, voice |
| 1996 | An Occasional Hell | Draper Jewett | |
| 1997 | American Perfekt | Willy | |
| 1997 | Midnight in the Garden of Good and Evil | Luther Driggers | |
| 1999 | Five Aces | Sloan | |
| 2000 | The Prophet's Game | Guest #1 | |
| 2000 | The Way of the Gun | Abner Mercer | |
| 2000 | Highway 395 | | |
| 2001 | Sunstorm | Browner | |
| 2002 | A Light in the Darkness | Stanley Melnick | |
| 2002 | The New Guy | Principal Zaylor | |
| 2003 | Mind Games | Melvin Reeves | |
| 2003 | A Painted House | Mr. Spruill | |
| 2004 | Blueberry | Greg Sullivan | (released in USA on DVD as Renegade) |
| 2005 | Social Guidance | Lucky Marshall | |
| 2005 | Down in the Valley | Sheridan | |
| 2005 | The Devil's Rejects | Roy Sullivan | |
| 2006 | Fingerprints | Keeler | |
| 2006 | Wicked Little Things | Harold | |
| 2007 | Cold Ones | Felton Jones | |
| 2007 | Moving McAllister | Crazy Old Martin | Uncredited |
| 2008 | I Am Somebody: No Chance in Hell | Lewis | |
| 2008 | Thomas Kinkade's Christmas Cottage | Butch | |
| 2009 | The Butcher | Naylor | |
| 2010 | Pickin' & Grinnin' | Cletus | |
| 2010 | Miss Nobody | Mr. Ketchum | |
| 2012 | Mommy's Little Monster | Stanley Melnick | |
| 2016 | Retreat! | Sullivan | |
| 2018 | High and Outside | Len Harding | (final film role) |

== Television ==
| Year | Title | Role | Notes |
|---|---|---|---|
| 1972 | Moon of the Wolf | Lawrence Burrifors | TV film |
| 1972 | Mannix | Ernest | Episode: "Days Beyond Recall" |
| 1972 | Cannon | James Bancroft | Episode: "Nobody Beats the House" |
| 1972 | Mannix | Killer | Episode: "Cry Silence" |
| 1972 | Mission: Impossible | Lusk | Episode: "Committed" |
| 1973-1980 | Barnaby Jones | Various | 3 episodes |
| 1974 | Honky Tonk | Roper | TV film |
| 1974 | The Gun and the Pulpit | Jason McCoy | TV film |
| 1974 | The Waltons | Elwood Dobbs | Episode: "The Runaway" |
| 1974 | The Great Ice Rip-Off | Archie | TV film |
| 1975 | Attack on Terror: The FBI vs. the Ku Klux Klan | Ed Duncan | TV film |
| 1975 | The Streets of San Francisco | Harris | Episode: "School of Fear" |
| 1975 | S.W.A.T. | Jack Bonelli | Episode: "The Killing Ground" |
| 1975 | Harry O | Senator John Elton | Episode: "Mayday" |
| 1975 | Starsky & Hutch | Allen "Monk" Philos | Episode: "The Fix" |
| 1976-1983 | Little House on the Prairie | Sam Galendar/Cole Younger | 2 episodes |
| 1976 | The New Daughters of Joshua Cabe | Dutton | TV film |
| 1976 | The Great Houdini | Dr. Crandon | TV film |
| 1976 | Monster Squad | The Skull | Episode: "The Skull" |
| 1976 | The Rookies | Ritchie | Season 4, Episode 23 "Journey to Oblivion" |
| 1977 | The Deadly Triangle | Red Bayliss | TV film |
| 1977 | The Hunted Lady | Mr. Eckert | TV film |
| 1977 | Hawaii Five-O | Commander Nolan | Episode: "Deep Cover" |
| 1977-1980 | Lou Grant | Sheriff/Jim Lawrence | 2 episodes |
| 1978 | When Every Day Was the Fourth of July | Albert “Snowman” Cavanaugh | TV film |
| 1979 | The Jericho Mile | Dr. Bill Janowski | TV film |
| 1979 | Samurai | Harold Tigner | TV film |
| 1979 | Salem's Lot | Mike Ryerson | Miniseries |
| 1980 | Belle Starr | Reverend Meeks | TV film |
| 1980-1981 | Flo | Earl Tucker | |
| 1981 | Skyward Christmas | Koup | TV film |
| 1982 | The Shadow Riders | Major Cooper Ashbury, Comanchero Leader | TV film |
| 1982 | Life of the Party: The Story of Beatrice | Captain Charley Rawlins | TV film |
| 1983 | Return of the Man from U.N.C.L.E. | Janus | TV film |
| 1983 | Mama's Family | Claude Cainmaker | 2 episodes |
| 1983 | Travis McGee | John Tuckerman | TV film |
| 1983 | September Gun | Sheriff Johnson | TV film |
| 1984 | Highway to Heaven | Honest Eddie | Episode: "Another Song for Christmas" |
| 1984-1985 | The A-Team | Kale Sykes/Colonel Mack Stoddard | 2 episodes |
| 1985 | Stormin' Home | Scooter Lee | TV film |
| 1985 | The Fall Guy | Matt Barris | Episode: "The King of the Stuntmen" |
| 1986 | Dallas: The Early Years | Ed Porter | TV film |
| 1986 | Annihilator | Professor Alan Jeffries | TV film |
| 1986 | Spot Marks the X | Dirty Jerry | TV film |
| 1986 | MacGyver | David Crane | Episode: "Silent World" |
| 1987 | The Golden Girls | Chuck | Episode: "Empty Nests" |
| 1987 | Designing Women | Dr. Davis Jackson | Episode: "Mary Jo's Dad Dates Charlene" |
| 1988 | Desert Rats | Del Rains | TV film |
| 1988 | Pancho Barnes | Ben Catlin | TV film |
| 1989 | Desperado: The Outlaw Wars | Oliver Ostrow | TV film |
| 1990 | Gunsmoke: The Last Apache | Bodine | TV film |
| 1990 | Matters of the Heart | Frank Harper | TV film |
| 1994 | Day of Reckoning | Matt | TV film |
| 1994 | Walker, Texas Ranger | Sheriff Beau Langley | Episode: "Badge of Honour" |
| 1994 | Gambler V: Playing for Keeps | Lynch | TV film |
| 1995 | When the Dark Man Calls | John "Parmenter" | TV film |
| 1995 | Kansas | J.D. | TV film |
| 1996 | Trilogy of Terror II | Stubbs | TV film |
| 1997 | Rough Riders | Eli | Miniseries |
| 1997 | The Underworld | Joe | TV film |
| 1999 | The X-Files | Alfred Fellig | Episode: "Tithonus" |
| 2001 | Titus | Calvin | Episode: "Dave Joins the Army" |
| 2003 | Dawson's Creek | Uncle Bill | 2 episodes |
| 2004 | Law and Order: Criminal Intent | Butch | Episode: "In the Dark" |
| 2006 | Wild Hearts | Hank | TV film |
| 2006 | Criminal Minds | Coroner | Episode: "The Boogeyman" |
| 2007 | House, M.D. | Older Man | Episode: "One Day, One Room" |
