= Google Me (film) =

2007 film

- Directed by: Jim Killeen
- Written by: Jim Killeen; Jeannie Roshar
- Starring: Jim Killeen; Jeannie Roshar
- Music by: Geoff Levin
- Release date: 25 November 2007
- Running time: 97 minutes
- Country: United States
- Language: English

Google Me is a 2007 American documentary film directed and produced by Jim Killeen. The film's music was composed by Geoff Levin.

== Synopsis ==
This documentary is about a man, Jim Killeen, who decided to go beyond a Google search of himself and record the exploration and interactions with the men who share his name. Killeen made the decision to be thorough in his endeavors and took the extra step to travel to the location of these men to get the full scoop on the stories of their lives. He faced more rejection than expected initially when extending the offer to travel to the location of his fellow Killeen's, even gambling in a poker tournament to raise funds for the film production. Killeen meets several other Jim Killeen's all ranging from a priest in Ireland to a swinger in Colorado. They all have exceptionally different backgrounds and shockingly a couple of them actually favor each other in looks. Killeen focuses on the similarities of their lifestyles, in spite of their implied social contradictions. At the end of the film Killeen asks all of them questions such as "What is the purpose of life?" to things they do and do not believe in. At the end of the movie all of the Jim Killeen's meet in Killeen, TX for the 125th-year celebration. They all join in on the town's celebration and share their life stories with each other. This movie exposes the common denominator of different people with different lives and shows the audience how the internet can shape our own identity. These two components provide stories and insight on the power of technology in the digital age.

== Cast ==
- Jim Killeen as himself, filmmaker
- Jeannie Roshar as herself
- Father Jim Killeen as himself, priest in Ireland
- Jim Killeen as himself, Scotland, United Kingdom
- Jim Killeen as himself, Colorado, USA
- Jim Killeen as himself, Australia
- Jim Killeen as himself, New York, USA
- Jim Killeen as himself, St. Louis, MO

There are a total of six different men with the name "Jim Killeen" throughout the film.

== Production ==
The documentary Google Me began production in 2007 and was inspired by the star of the project, Jim Killeen, who produced the movie using his own funding, money won from a poker tournament. The film was produced in multiple cities including New York, Australia, Ireland, Killeen, TX and Denver.

== Release ==
On November 25, 2007, the film was first released on DVD in the United States.
