= David Campbell (composer) =

Canadian-American arranger and composer (born 1948)

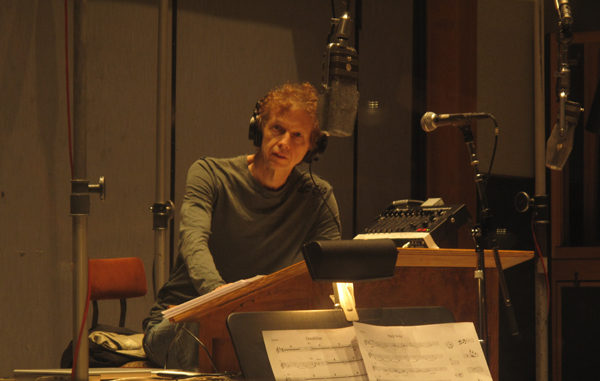
- Campbell in 2009

Background information
- Born: David Richard Campbell; 7 February 1948 (age 78); Toronto, Ontario, Canada
- Genres: Rock; pop; country; alternative; indie rock; hip hop; R&B; blues; jazz; punk; rock en español; metal; classical
- Occupations: Arranger; composer; conductor; musician
- Instruments: Viola; violin; piano
- Years active: 1965–present
- Website: davidmusic.com

David Richard Campbell (born 7 February 1948) is a Canadian-American arranger, composer, musician, and conductor. He has composed and arranged music for many films, including North Country (2005), Brokeback Mountain (2005), August: Osage County (2013), Annie (2014), Foxcatcher (2014), Rock of Ages (2012), Dreamgirls (2006), and Joy (2015). He has also worked on over 450 gold and platinum albums by artists of a wide range of genres, including Bon Jovi, The Rolling Stones, Neil Diamond, Metallica, Kiss, Radiohead, Dolly Parton, Emmylou Harris, Linda Ronstadt, Evanescence, Rush, Beyoncé, Muse, Michael Jackson, Aaliyah, Ariana Grande, Harry Styles, Aerosmith, Juanes, Garth Brooks, Green Day, and various albums by his son Beck.

== Early life and education ==
Campbell was born in Toronto, Ontario. His father, D. Warren Campbell, was from Winnipeg, Manitoba, and was attending seminary in Toronto in order to become a Presbyterian minister. Campbell subsequently was assigned to a church in Pittsburgh, taking his family with him, before settling in Seattle. Campbell took up the violin at age 9. At age 12, he began venturing into orchestration, studying the works of Bartók, Schoenberg and Stravinsky.

In the late 1960s, after studying at Manhattan School of Music, Campbell moved from New York to Los Angeles and began studying pop music. He studied the music of The Beatles, Leonard Cohen, and The Rolling Stones, and he played bluegrass music for crowds in line for movies in Westwood Village.

== Career ==
At age 23, Campbell played on his first major album, Tapestry, by Carole King. This led to his first arranger role, for King's Rhymes and Reasons album. Campbell also played viola on recording sessions such as Marvin Gaye's "Let's Get It On" and Bill Withers' "Lean on Me". Since then, he has gone on to arrange songs for such artists as Bob Dylan, The Rolling Stones, Bon Jovi, Dream Theater, Metallica, Paul McCartney, Radiohead, Jessie J, Juanes, Tim McGraw, Adele, Ricky Martin, Barbra Streisand, and Miley Cyrus.

As a composer, David has written music for many films including Joy, Paper Tigers and Colombia: magia salvaje. He has also arranged and orchestrated music for over 80 films including Annie (2014), Foxcatcher (2014), August: Osage County (2013), Rock of Ages (2012), Dreamgirls (2007), North Country (2005), and Brokeback Mountain (2005). In 2010 he worked with Nigel Godrich on the score for Scott Pilgrim vs. The World. In 2016, he co-composed the 40-minute ballet Rules of the Game with Pharrell Williams.

David has guest-conducted the Los Angeles Philharmonic and the Hollywood Bowl Orchestra at the Hollywood Bowl for Faith Hill, Death Cab for Cutie, Ray LaMontagne, Beck, Sheryl Crow, Willie Nelson, and The xx. He collaborated with Muse for the performance of "Survival", the official song of the London Olympics. He also collaborated with Beck for the Lincoln Motor Company ad campaign, "Hello, Again", which featured a live performance of Beck's "Sound and Vision" cover and included 167 live musicians playing simultaneously. In February 2009 Campbell arranged Radiohead's "15 Step" for the band's collaboration with the USC Marching Band at the 2009 Grammy Awards. He conducted the Los Angeles Philharmonic, as well as arranged and orchestrated the music for Beck's Song Reader concert at the Walt Disney Concert Hall, which featured many performers, including Childish Gambino, Juanes, Anne Hathaway, John C. Reilly, Jack Black, and Jarvis Cocker. He arranged and orchestrated for the Seattle Symphony and Pickwick's Sonic Evolution show on 6 June 2014.

In 2003, he served as conductor of the Melbourne Symphony Orchestra during their one-night performance with Kiss, which was released on the album Kiss Symphony: Alive IV. During the concert, Campbell and the members of the orchestra wore the iconic Kiss makeup along with the members of the band.

In 2018, for the LA Phil's 100th anniversary celebrations, David wrote arrangements for Chris Martin's and Corinne Bailey Rae's performances at Disney Hall, as well as Katy Perry's and Kali Uchis' performances at the Hollywood Bowl, all of which were conducted by Gustavo Dudamel.

In 2019, he wrote arrangements for and conducted the LA Philharmonic, National Symphony Orchestra and Cincinnati Orchestra for Iron & Wine's 15th anniversary of Our Endless Numbered Days.

He created the song arrangements, dance arrangements, underscoring and orchestrations for the Broadway musical Spider-Man: Turn Off the Dark.

== List of album arrangements and singles ==
2024

- Joker: Folie à Deux (soundtrack) (big band, orchestra)
- Lady Gaga – Harlequin (big band, strings and production)
- Bon Jovi – Forever (Bon Jovi album) (strings)
- Billie Eilish – Hit Me Hard and Soft (strings)
- Green Day – Saviors (strings and horns)
- Joe Bonamassa – Live at the Hollywood Bowl with Orchestra (orchestra)
- Andrea Bocelli – Duets (strings)

2023

- The Rolling Stones – Hackney Diamonds (strings)
- Post Malone – Austin (strings)
- Dave Matthews Band – Walk Around the Moon (strings)
- Micah McLaurin – Diamonds (Micah McLaurin album) (orchestra)

2022

- Burna Boy – Love, Damini (orchestra)
- Beth Hart – A Tribute to Led Zeppelin (orchestra)
- Attacca Quartet – Classical Carols Covered Apple Music
- Neil Diamond – A Neil Diamond Christmas (orchestra and choir)
- Capital Theatre – "Fait Accompli" (strings)
- Beach House – Once Twice Melody (strings)
- Michael Bublé – Higher (strings)
- Ozzy Osbourne – Patient Number 9 (strings)
- Elton John – The Lockdown Sessions (strings)
- Pentatonix – Holidays Around the World (strings)
- Eddie Vedder – Earthling (orchestra)
- Edgar Winter – Brother Johnny (strings)
- Backstreet Boys – A Very Backstreet Christmas (strings)
- Maria Bethânia & Pantanal" (strings)
- Billy Talent - Crisis of Faith (strings)

2021

- Adele – 30 (strings)
- Billie Eilish – Happier Than Ever: A Love Letter to Los Angeles (orchestra)
- Diane Warren – The Cave Sessions Vol. 1 (strings)
- Julia Michaels – Not in Chronological Order (strings)
- Jessie J – Women to the Front (strings)
- Kalen Anzai – Kimi to Boku no Uta (strings)
- Evanescence – The Bitter Truth (strings)
- Garth Brooks & Trisha Yearwood – "Shallow" (strings)
- Mau y Ricky – "Doleria" (strings)
- Allie Colleen Brooks – Stones (strings)
- Diane Warren & Laura Pausini – "Io Sì" (strings)
- Ben Platt – Born This Way 10th Anniversary (strings)
- Lake Street Dive – "Nobody's Stopping You Now" (strings)
- Cinderella – Soundtrack (orchestra)
- Billy Currington – "Words" (strings)
- Kaleo – Surface Sounds (strings)

2020

- Cam – The Otherside (orchestra)
- Ariana Grande – Positions (strings)
- Charlie Puth – Free (strings)
- Laura Pausini – Seen (strings)
- Kane Brown – John Legend - Last Time I Say Sorry (strings)
- Tommy Torres – Aprenderemos (strings)
- Carrie Underwood – My Gift (orchestra)
- Tim McGraw – Here On Earth (strings)
- Garth Brooks – Fun (strings)
- Bon Jovi – 2020 (strings)

2019

- Harry Styles – Fine Line (orchestra)
- Taylor Swift – Beautiful Ghosts (orchestra)
- Leonard Cohen – Thanks for the Dance (strings)
- Mark Ronson – Late Night Feelings (strings)
- Melissa Etheridge – I Know You (strings)
- Freya Ridings – Freya Ridings (album) (strings)
- Cage the Elephant – Social Cues (strings)
- Luis Fonsi – Vida (strings)
- Tommy Torres – Tres Minutos (strings)
- Various Artists, Beck – Music Inspired by the Film Roma (strings)
- Ximena Sariñana – Cobarde (strings)
- Roger Daltrey – The Who's Tommy Orchestral (orchestra)

2018

- Hanson – String Theory (orchestra)
- Dave Matthews Band – Come Tomorrow
- Muse – Simulation Theory (brass, strings)
- Carlos Rivera – Guerra (strings)
- Lily Allen – No Shame (strings)
- Barbra Streisand – Walls (strings)
- Paul McCartney – Egypt Station (choir)
- Steve Perry – Traces (strings)
- The Beach Boys – The Beach Boys With The Royal Philharmonic Orchestra (full orchestra)
- Roy Orbison – Unchained Melodies
- The 1975 – A Brief Inquiry into Online Relationships (strings)
- Sebastián Yatra, Tommy Torres – Atado Entre Tus Manos (single)
- Tommy Torres – Todo Me Requerda A Ti
- Tim McGraw – Gravity (strings)

2017

- Billy Raffoul – 1975
- Evanescence – Synthesis (orchestra)
- Beck – Colors
- Pauline Frechette – Follow My Heart
- Cheng Lin – King of Peace (strings)
- Café Tacuba – Jei Beibi (strings)
- Roger Waters – Is This the Life We Really Want? (strings)
- Tim McGraw – Faith Hill − The Rest of Our Life
- Antonio José – Tu Boca (strings)

2016

- M83 – Junk (orchestra, choir)
- Dream Theater – The Astonishing (orchestra, choir)
- Garth Brooks – Gunslinger (strings)
- Jacqui Hylton – Beautiful
- KT Tunstall – Kin
- Lady Antebellum – Heart Break (strings)
- Luis Fonsi – Ahi Estas Tu
- Tim McGraw – Faith Hill – Keep Your Eyes on Me
- Pharrell Williams – Rules of the Game (orchestra)

2015

- Alejandro Sanz – Sirope (strings)
- Of Monsters and Men – Beneath the Skin (brass, strings)
- Tim McGraw – Damn Country Music (strings)
- Tommy Torres – Ven (strings)
- Colombia Magia Salvaje – Soundtrack (orchestra)
- Joy – Soundtrack (orchestra)

2014

- Beck – Morning Phase (strings, brass)
- Christina Perri – Head or Heart (strings)
- D.A. Wallach – Glowing (strings, woodwinds, brass)
- David Bisbal – Tú y Yo (strings)
- Garth Brooks — Man Against Machine (strings)
- Jennifer Nettles – That Girl (strings, woodwinds, brass)
- OK Go – Hungry Ghosts (strings)
- Rascal Flatts – Rewind (strings)
- The Griswolds — Be Impressive (strings)
- Tim McGraw — Sundown Heaven Town (strings)
- Trisha Yearwood — PrizeFighter: Hit After Hit (strings)
- U2 — Songs of Innocence (Deluxe Edition)

2013

- Avenged Sevenfold – Hail to the King (strings, horns)
- Biffy Clyro – Opposites (strings, choir, brass, bagpipes)
- Bon Jovi – What About Now (strings)
- Christina Perri – A Thousand Years (strings, horns)
- David Bisbal − Tú y Yo (David Bisbal album) (strings)
- Dido – Girl Who Got Away (strings)
- Ghost – Infestissumam (choir, score editor)
- Jake Bugg – Jake Bugg (strings, choir)
- Jessie J – Alive (strings)
- Josh Groban – All That Echoes (strings, brass)
- Miley Cyrus – Bangerz (strings)
- Pink – The Truth About Love (strings)
- Tim McGraw – Two Lanes of Freedom (strings)
- Tommy Torres – 12 Historias (strings)

2012

- Alanis Morissette – Havoc and Bright Lights (woodwinds)
- Dwight Yoakam – 3 Pears (strings, brass)
- Grace Potter and the Nocturnals – The Lion the Beast the Beat (strings)
- Jason Mraz – Love Is a Four Letter Word (strings)
- King Charles – Loveblood (horns, strings)
- Marina and the Diamonds – Electra Heart (strings)
- Muse – The 2nd Law (strings, brass, choir)
- Rush – Clockwork Angels (strings)
- Shinedown – Amaryllis (strings)
- Taylor Swift – Red (strings)
- The Fray – Scars & Stories (strings)

2011

- Adele – 21 (strings)
- Antonio Carmona – De Noche (strings, woodwinds, horns)
- Avril Lavigne – Goodbye Lullaby (strings)
- Christina Perri – Lovestrong (strings, percussion)
- Demi Lovato – Unbroken (strings)
- Evanescence – Evanescence (strings)
- Journey – Greatest Hits 2
- Martina McBride – Eleven (strings)
- Spider-Man: Turn Off the Dark (orchestra, vocals)
- Trading Yesterday – More than This (strings)
- Unicorn – Z (brass, strings)
- Various artists – Listen to Me: Buddy Holly (strings, percussion)
- X Japan – "Jade" (orchestration with Yoshiki)

2010

- Adam Lambert – For Your Entertainment (strings and horns)
- Adam Lambert – Time for Miracles (strings and horns)
- Alejandro Sanz – Paraiso Express (strings)
- Debi Nova – Luna Nueva (strings)
- Due Voci – Due Voci (strings and horns)
- Jimmy Eat World – Invented (strings)
- Meat Loaf – Hang Cool Teddy Bear (strings and percussion)
- Michael Jackson – Michael (strings)
- Miranda Cosgrove – Sparks Fly (strings)
- No Machine – Toast the Toaster (strings)
- The Rolling Stones – Exile on Main St. (strings)
- Takako Matsu – Time for Music (strings, horns, woodwinds)
- We Are the Fallen – Tear the World Down (strings)

2009

- Ashley Monroe – Satisfied (strings)
- Biffy Clyro – Only Revolutions (strings, brass, woodwinds)
- Charlotte Gainsbourg – IRM (strings)
- Crash Kings – Crash Kings (strings)
- Daniel Merriweather – Love & War (strings)
- Dave Matthews Band – Big Whiskey and the GrooGrux King (strings)
- David Cook – David Cook (strings)
- Dido – Safe Trip Home (strings)
- Five for Fighting – Slice (strings)
- The Fray – The Fray (strings)
- Hoobastank – Fornever (strings)
- Laura Izibor – Let The Truth Be Told (strings)
- M. Ward – Hold Time (strings)
- Maroon 5 – His Way, Our Way (big band)
- Martina McBride – Shine (strings)
- Oksana Grigorieva – Beautiful Heartache (strings)
- Paolo Spoladore – Shiloh (choir, strings, horns, woodwinds, percussion)
- Paper Route – Absence (strings)
- P.T. Walkley – Mr. Macy Wakes Alone (strings)
- Rascal Flatts – Unstoppable (strings)
- Rascal Flatts – Unwrapped (strings and horns)
- Small Time Sleeper – Conversations
- Tim McGraw – Southern Voice (strings)
- Uncle Kracker – Happy Hour (strings)

2008

- Adam Green – Sixes & Sevens (strings, horns)
- A Fine Frenzy – One Cell in the Sea
- Augustana – Can't Love, Can't Hurt (strings)
- Ayumi Hamasaki – Guilty (strings)
- Beck – Modern Guilt (strings)
- Carly Simon – This Kind of Love (strings)
- Faith Hill – Joy To The World (big band, orchestral)
- Ferras – Aliens & Rainbows (strings)
- Hana Pestle – This Way (strings)
- I Nine – Heavy Weighs the King (strings)
- Lee Seung-Hwan – Tattoo
- Lenka – Lenka (strings)
- Leona Lewis – Spirit (Strings)
- Louis XIV – Slick Dogs and Ponies (strings)
- Metallica – Death Magnetic (strings)
- My Morning Jacket – Evil Urges (strings)
- Neil Diamond – Home Before Dark (strings)
- Rhydian – Rhydian (strings)
- Shinedown – The Sound of Madness (strings)
- Simple Plan – Simple Plan (strings)
- Tommy Torres – Tarde O Temprano (strings)
- Trisha Yearwood – Heaven, Heartache and the Power of Love (strings)
- Was (Not Was) – Boo! (strings)

2007

- Air – Pocket Symphony (strings)
- Ashley Tisdale – Headstrong (strings)
- Avril Lavigne – The Best Damn Thing (strings)
- Ayumi Hamasaki – Together When...
- Carina Ricco – Viaje Personal
- Celine Dion – Taking Chances (strings)
- Charlotte Gainsbourg – 5:55 (strings)
- David Vandervelde – The Moonstation House Band (strings)
- Enrique Iglesias – Insomniac (strings)
- Garth Brooks – The Ultimate Hits (strings)
- Jimmy Eat World – Chase This Light (strings)
- Juanes – La vida... es un ratico (strings)
- Kid Rock – Rock n Roll Jesus (strings)
- Linkin Park – Minutes to Midnight (strings)
- Maroon 5 – It Won't Be Soon Before Long (strings)
- Martina McBride – Waking Up Laughing (strings)
- Sara Bareilles – Little Voice (strings)
- Scorpions – Humanity Hour 1 (strings)
- The Spill Canvas – No Really, I'm Fine
- Sum 41 – Underclass Hero (strings)
- X Japan – Jealousy (strings)

2006

- Beck – The Information
- Beyoncé – B'Day
- Antonio Carmona – Vengo Venenoso
- Celestial Navigations – Connection: Chapter 5
- Celestial Navigations – Live at the Matrix (keyboards, strings, vocals)
- Charlotte Gainsbourg – The Songs That We Sing (strings)
- Dixie Chicks – Taking the Long Way (strings)
- Dreamgirls – Dreamgirls: Music from the Motion Picture
- Evanescence – The Open Door (strings)
- Five for Fighting – Two Lights (strings)
- Frankie J – Priceless
- Goo Goo Dolls – Let Love In (strings)
- Jewel – Goodbye Alice in Wonderland
- Johnny Cash – American V: A Hundred Highways (strings)
- Josh Groban – Awake (strings)
- Juanes – Mi Sangre (strings)
- Julio Iglesias – Romantic Classics
- Justin Timberlake – FutureSex/LoveSounds (strings)
- Keith Urban – Love, Pain & the Whole Crazy Thing
- Live – Songs from Black Mountain (strings)
- Meat Loaf – Bat Out of Hell III: The Monster Is Loose
- My Chemical Romance – The Black Parade (strings, horns)
- Nelly Furtado – Loose (strings)
- Rascal Flatts – Me and My Gang (strings)
- Raul Malo – You're Only Lonely
- Sarah Kelly – Where the Past Meets Today

2005

- Alex Lloyd – Alex Lloyd
- Anastacia – Pieces of a Dream
- B. B. King – B.B. King & Friends: 80 (strings)
- Beck – Guero
- Billy Joel – My Lives
- Bon Jovi – Have a Nice Day
- David Crowder Band – A Collision (strings)
- Daniel Bedingfield – Second First Impression
- Eric Benét – Hurricane
- Fort Minor – The Rising Tied (strings)
- Gary Allan – Tough All Over
- Gustavo Santaolalla – Brokeback Mountain: Original Motion Picture Soundtrack
- Gustavo Santaolalla – North Country: Music from the Motion Picture
- Idlewild – Not Just Sometimes But Always (strings)
- Leonard Cohen: I'm Your Man – Motion Picture Soundtrack
- Lindsay Lohan – A Little More Personal (Raw)
- Lisa Marie Presley – Now What
- Liz Phair – Somebody's Miracle (strings)
- Mark Owen – How the Mighty Fall (strings, horns)
- The Mars Volta – Frances the Mute (strings, brass, piano, percussion)
- Melanie – Photograph
- Montgomery Gentry – Something to Be Proud Of: The Best of 1999–2005
- Neil Diamond – 12 Songs (horns)
- Paul McCartney – Chaos and Creation in the Backyard (strings)
- The Prom Kings – The Prom Kings
- Robbie Williams – Intensive Care (strings)
- Sheryl Crow – Wildflower (strings)
- Steven Curtis Chapman – The Chronicles of Narnia: The Lion, the Witch and the Wardrobe (strings)

2004

- Alter Bridge – One Day Remains (strings)
- Ashlee Simpson – Autobiography (strings)
- Avril Lavigne – Under My Skin (strings)
- Charlotte Martin – On Your Shore
- Diana DeGarmo – Blue Skies
- Everlast – White Trash Beautiful
- Fantasia – Free Yourself
- Five for Fighting – The Battle for Everything
- Good Charlotte – The Chronicles of Life and Death
- Graham Colton Band – Drive
- James Otto – Days of Our Lives (strings)
- Jimmy Eat World – Futures
- Kelly Clarkson – Breakaway
- Lindsay Lohan – Speak
- Lit – Lit
- Lostprophets – Start Something (strings)
- New Found Glory – Catalyst (strings)
- Spymob – Sitting Around Keeping Score
- Tamyra Gray – The Dreamer
- Tim McGraw – Live Like You Were Dying (strings)
- Train – Alive at Last
- Van Hunt – Van Hunt
- Wilson Phillips – California

2003

- Alien Ant Farm – truANT
- The Bangles – Doll Revolution
- Blackstreet – Level II
- Cat Power – You Are Free
- Evanescence – Fallen
- Eve 6 – It's All in Your Head
- Kiss – Kiss Symphony: Alive IV
- Lamb – Between Darkness and Wonder
- Linkin Park – Meteora (strings)
- Lisa Marie Presley – To Whom It May Concern (strings)
- Macy Gray – The Trouble with Being Myself
- Maria – My Soul
- Memento – Beginnings
- Michelle Branch – Hotel Paper
- Nelly Furtado – Folklore
- Phil Collins – Brother Bear: An Original Walt Disney Records Soundtrack
- Revis – Places for Breathing
- Ricky Martin – Almas del Silencio
- Ruben Studdard – Soulful (strings)
- The Thrills – So Much for the City
- Year of the Rabbit – Year of the Rabbit

2002

- Beck – Sea Change
- Brandy – Full Moon (strings)
- Darren Hayes – Spin
- Def Leppard – X (strings)
- Faith Hill – Cry (strings)
- Good Charlotte – The Young and the Hopeless (strings)
- Laura Pausini – From the Inside
- LeAnn Rimes – Twisted Angel
- Mariah Carey – Charmbracelet (strings)
- Robin Williams – Live 2002
- Sixpence None the Richer – Divine Discontent (strings)
- The Wallflowers – Red Letter Days (strings)
- Taproot – Welcome (strings)
- 3 Doors Down – Away from the Sun (strings)

2001

- Aerosmith – Just Push Play (strings)
- Anastacia – Freak of Nature (strings)
- Brooks & Dunn – Steers & Stripes
- Jennifer Warnes – The Well
- Leonard Cohen – Ten New Songs
- Lit – Atomic (strings)
- Michael Jackson – Invincible (strings)
- Nikka Costa – Everybody Got Their Something (strings)
- Paul McCartney – Driving Rain (strings)
- Smash Mouth – Smash Mouth
- Train – Drops of Jupiter (strings)
- Alien Ant Farm - ANThology (strings)

2000

- BBMak – Sooner or Later
- Bon Jovi – Crush (strings)
- Duran Duran – Pop Trash (strings)
- Everlast – Eat at Whitey's (strings)
- Fuel – Something Like Human (strings)
- XXVII Olympiad – Official Music from the Opening Ceremony
- Green Day – Warning (strings)
- Poe – Poe
- Ricky Martin – Sound Loaded
- Sinéad O'Connor – Faith and Courage

1999

- Amanda Marshall – Tuesday's Child (strings)
- Beck – Midnite Vultures
- Counting Crows – This Desert Life
- Emmylou Harris, Linda Ronstadt, Dolly Parton – Trio II (strings)
- Enrique Iglesias – Enrique
- Los Fabulosos Cadillacs – Aguila
- Macy Gray – On How Life Is
- Phil Collins – Tarzan: An Original Walt Disney Records Soundtrack
- Reef – Rides
- Ricky Martin – Ricky Martin
- Stone Temple Pilots – No. 4
- Styx - Brave New World (conductor, strings)
- 21st Century Girls – 21st Century Girls

1998

- Alanis Morissette – Supposed Former Infatuation Junkie (strings)
- Beck – Mutations
- The Black Crowes – By Your Side
- Goo Goo Dolls – Dizzy Up the Girl (strings)
- Hole – Celebrity Skin
- Jude – No One Is Really Beautiful (strings)
- Hootie & the Blowfish – Musical Chairs
- Richie Sambora – Undiscovered Soul

1997

- Aerosmith – Nine Lives
- Beck – Odelay B Sides
- Billy Joel – Greatest Hits Volume III
- Green Day – Nimrod
- Lee Seung-Hwan – Cycle
- Leonard Cohen – More Best of
- Kara's Flowers – The Fourth World
- Stanley Clarke – The Bass-ic Collection

1996

- Journey – Trial by Fire
- Cracker – The Golden Age
- Dead Man Walking – Dead Man Walking: The Score (choir)
- France Gall – France (strings)
- Joe Cocker – Organic
- John Berry – Faces
- Manowar – Louder Than Hell

1995

- 3T – Free Willy 2: The Adventure Home
- Bon Jovi – These Days
- Bugs & Friends – Sing the Beatles
- Joshua Kadison – Delilah Blue
- Kris Kristofferson – A Moment of Forever
- Lee Seung-Hwan – "For 1,000 days"
- Medicine – Her Highness
- Melissa Manchester – If My Heart Had Wings
- Tina Arena – Don't Ask
- Various Artists – Tower of Song: The Songs of Leonard Cohen

1994

- Aerosmith – "Crazy"
- Bon Jovi – "Always"
- Bonnie Raitt – Longing in Their Hearts
- The Rolling Stones – Voodoo Lounge (strings)
- Willie Nelson – Healing Hands of Time

1993

- Aerosmith – "Amazing"
- Alexander O'Neal – Love Makes No Sense
- Celine Dion – The Colour of My Love
- David Crosby – Thousand Roads (strings)
- Jann Arden – Time for Mercy
- Maria McKee – You Gotta Sin to Get Saved
- Willie Nelson – Across the Borderline

1992

- Bernadette Peters – Bernadette
- Leonard Cohen – The Future (strings, backing vocals)
- Neil Diamond – The Christmas Album
- Roy Orbison – King of Hearts
- Vonda Shepard – Radical Light

1991

- Aaron Neville – Warm Your Heart
- Alice Cooper – Hey Stoopid
- Bonnie Raitt – Luck of the Draw
- Neil Diamond – Lovescape
- Diana Ross – The Force Behind the Power
- The Temptations – Milestone
- The Smithereens – Blow Up
- X – Jealousy

1989

- Linda Ronstadt – Cry Like a Rainstorm, Howl Like the Wind

1987

- Dolly Parton – Rainbow
- Dolly Parton, Linda Ronstadt, & Emmylou Harris – Trio

1986

- 10,000 Maniacs – In My Tribe

1983

- All the Right Moves – All the Right Moves Soundtrack

1981

- Art Garfunkel – Scissors Cut
- Rita Coolidge – Heartbreak Radio
- Robin Williamson – Songs of Love and Parting
- Gábor Szabó – Femme Fatale

1979

- Louise Goffin – Kid Blue
- Maria Muldaur – Open Your Eyes
- Badfinger – Airwaves
- David Castle – Love You Forever
- Karla Bonoff – Restless Nights
- Olivia Hussey – Melancholy Café / Arabesque
- Crystal Mansion – The Crystal Mansion

1978

- Andrew Gold – All This and Heaven Too
- Carole Bayer Sager – ... Too
- Poco – Legend
- John Hall – John Hall
- Laura Allan – Laura Allan
- Eddie Rabbitt – Variations
- Leo Sayer – Leo Sayer
- Rare Earth – Band Together
- Rare Earth – Grand Slam
- Dusty Springfield – It Begins Again
- Starland Vocal Band – Late Nite Radio
- James Vincent – Waiting For The Rain
- Kate & Anna McGarrigle – Pronto Monto

1977

- Art Garfunkel – Watermark
- Cat Stevens – Izitso
- Lucy Simon – Stolen Time
- James Taylor – JT
- Karla Bonoff – Karla Bonoff
- Linda Ronstadt – Simple Dreams
- Olivia Newton-John – Making a Good Thing Better
- Carole Bayer Sager – Carole Bayer Sager
- Wendy Waldman – The Main Refrain
- Jelly – A True Story

1976

- Jackson Browne – The Pretender
- JD Souther – Black Rose
- Jimmie Spheeris – Ports of the Heart
- Linda Ronstadt – Hasten Down the Wind
- Melanie – Photograph
- Pure Prairie League – Dance
- Mr Big – Photographic Smile
- Tom Snow – Tom Snow
- Richard Supa – Life Lines
- Pablo Cruise - Lifeline

1975

- Jimmie Spheeris – The Dragon Is Dancing
- Linda Ronstadt – Prisoner in Disguise
- Karen Alexander – Isn't It Always Love
- Emperor – Woman & The Time That It Takes
- Wings Livinryte– Your Love Keeps Me Off The Streets

1974

- Carole King – Wrap Around Joy
- Linda Ronstadt – Heart Like a Wheel
- Rita Coolidge – Fall into Spring
- Jackson Browne – Late for the Sky

1973

- Carole King – Fantasy
- Jimmie Spheeris – Original Tap Dancing Kid
- Jackson Browne – For Everyman

1972

- Carole King – Rhymes & Reasons
- Jackson Browne – Jackson Browne (viola)

1971

- Jimmie Spheeris – Isle of View

== Filmography ==
Partial list of films that David Campbell's work contributed to.

Year	Film	Role	Directed by	Notes / Accolades
2024	Joker: Folie à Deux	TBA	Todd Phillips	
2022	Promised Land	Arranger, Orchestrator, Conductor	Matt Lopez	
2021	Finch	Arranger, Orchestrator, Conductor	Miguel Sapochnik	
2021	Happier Than Ever: A Love Letter to Los Angeles	Arranger, Orchestrator	Robert Rodriguez, Patrick Osborne	Nominated: Grammy Award Best Music Film & MTV Video Music Awards VMA Best Longform Video
2021	Cinderella	Arranger, Orchestrator	Kay Cannon	
2020	The Life Ahead	Arranger, Orchestrator	Edoardo Ponti	Wrote orchestral arrangement for "Seen" by Laura Pausini
2020	Mulan (2020)	Arranger, Orchestrator	Niki Caro	Wrote orchestra & choir arrangement for "Reflection"
2020	The One and Only Ivan	Arranger, Orchestrator	Thea Sharrock	Wrote string arrangement for "Free" by Charlie Puth
2019	Cats	Orchestrator, additional Arranger	Tom Hooper	Wrote string arrangement for "Beautiful Ghosts"
2019	The Goldfinch	Orchestrator, Conductor	John Crowley	
2018	Roma	Arranger	Alfonso Cuarón	Wrote arrangement for "Tarantula" by Beck
2018	Free Solo	Arranger, Orchestrator, Conductor	Elizabeth Chai Vasarhelyi|, Jimmy Chin	Wrote arrangement for "Gravity" by Tim McGraw
2017	Thoroughbreds	Songwriter	Cory Finley	Co-wrote "Chameleon" by Rome Will Burn
2017	The Shack	Arranger, Orchestrator, Conductor	Stuart Hazeldine	Wrote arrangement for "Keep Your Eyes On Me" by Faith Hill and Tim McGraw
2017	Eric Clapton: Life in 12 Bars	Arranger, Orchestrator, Conductor	Lili Fini Zanuck	
2016	In Search of Fellini	Composer	Taron Lexton	
2015	Demolition	Arranger	Jean-Marc Vallée	Wrote arrangement for "La Boheme"
2015	Joy	Composer (with West Thordson)	David O. Russell	The film was nominated for the Golden Globe for Best Motion Picture– Comedy or Musical
2015	Colombia, magia salvaje	Composer	Mike Slee	
2015	Paper Tigers	Composer: additional music	James Redford	
2014	Annie	Orchestrator	Will Gluck	
2014	Serena	Orchestrator	Susanne Bier	
2014	Effie Gray	Arranger, Orchestrator, Conductor	Richard Laxton	
2014	Foxcatcher	Orchestrator	Bennett Miller	
2013	August: Osage County	Arranger	John Wells	
2013	World War Z	Orchestrator, Conductor	Marc Forster	
2012	Rock of Ages	Arranger, Orchestrator, Conductor	Adam Shankman	
2010	Scott Pilgrim vs. the World	Arranger, Orchestrator, Conductor	Edgar Wright	
2008	W.	Arranger	Oliver Stone	
2008	The Yellow Handkerchief	Arranger: Strings	Udayan Prasad	
2007	This Christmas	Arranger, Orchestrator, Conductor	Preston A. Whitmore II	
2007	Things We Lost in the Fire	Conductor	Susanne Bier	
2007	The Brothers Warner	Composer	Cass Warner	
2006	Rocky Balboa	Arranger, Orchestrator, Conductor	Sylvester Stallone	
2006	Dreamgirls	Arranger: Strings	Bill Condon	
2006	Flicka	Arranger, Orchestrator, Conductor	Michael Mayer	
2005	Rent	Conductor: Strings and Horns	Chris Columbus	
2005	North Country	Conductor	Niki Caro	
2005	Trust the Man	Orchestrator	Bart Freundlich	
2005	Brokeback Mountain	Arranger: Strings	Ang Lee	Gustavo Santaolalla won the Oscar for Best Original Score
2004	Friday Night Lights	Orchestrator	Peter Berg	
2004	Raise Your Voice	Arranger, Orchestrator, Conductor	Sean McNamara	
2004	Ladder 49	Arranger, Orchestrator, Conductor	Jay Russell	Wrote string arrangement for "Shine Your Light" by Robbie Robertson
2004	Spider-Man 2	Arranger, Orchestrator, Conductor	Sam Raimi	Wrote string arrangement for "Ordinary" by Train
2004	Home on the Range	Arranger, Orchestrator, Conductor	Will Finn, John Sanford	
2003	Brother Bear	Arranger, Conductor	Aaron Blaise, Robert Walker	Wrote string arrangement for "Look Through My Eyes" by Phil Collins
2003	Daredevil	Arranger, Orchestrator, Conductor	Mark Steven Johnson	Wrote string arrangements for "For You" by The Calling and Evanescence songs
2002	Treasure Planet	Arranger, Orchestrator, Conductor	Ron Clements, John Musker	Wrote string arrangement for "I'm Still Here (Jim's Theme)" by John Rzeznik
2002	Men in Black II	Arranger, Orchestrator, Conductor	Barry Sonnenfeld	Wrote string arrangement for "Black Suits Comin' (Nod Ya Head)" by Will Smith
2002	The Sum of All Fears	Arranger, Orchestrator, Conductor	Phil Alden Robinson	Wrote string arrangement for "If We Could Remember" by Yolanda Adams
2002	The Sweetest Thing	Arranger, Orchestrator, Conductor	Roger Kumble	
2002	The Hunchback of Notre Dame II	Arranger, Conductor	Bradley Raymond	
2001	America's Sweethearts	Arranger, Orchestrator, Conductor	Joe Roth	Wrote string arrangement for "Some Hearts" by Kelly Levesque
2001	Pearl Harbor	Arranger, Orchestrator, Conductor	Michael Bay	Wrote string arrangement for "There You'll Be" by Faith Hill
2000	Dr. Seuss' How the Grinch Stole Christmas	Arranger, Orchestrator, Conductor	Ron Howard	Wrote string arrangement for "Where Are You Christmas?" by Faith Hill
2000	How to Kill Your Neighbor's Dog	Orchestrator, Conductor	Michael Kalesniko	
2000	Duets	Arranger, Orchestrator, Conductor	Bruce Paltrow	Wrote string arrangement for "Cruisin'" by Huey Lewis and Gwyneth Paltrow
2000	The Prime Gig	Orchestrator, Conductor	Gregory Mosher	
2000	Autumn in New York	Arranger, Orchestrator, Conductor	Joan Chen	Wrote string arrangement for "Beautiful" by Jennifer Paige
2000	Coyote Ugly	Conductor: Strings	David McNally	Wrote string arrangements for "Can't Fight the Moonlight", "The Right Kind of Wrong", and "But I Do Love You" by LeAnn Rimes
2000	Gone in 60 Seconds	Arranger, Orchestrator, Conductor	Dominic Sena	Wrote string arrangement for "Painted on My Heart" by The Cult
2000	Amores perros	Arranger, Orchestrator, Conductor	Alejandro González Iñárritu	Wrote string arrangements for Café Tacuba songs
2000	The Tigger Movie	Arranger, Orchestrator, Conductor	Jun Falkenstein	Wrote string arrangement for "Your Heart Will Lead You Home" by Kenny Loggins
1999	Anywhere but Here	Arranger, Orchestrator, Conductor	Wayne Wang	Wrote string arrangement for "Leaving's Not Leaving" by LeAnn Rimes
1999	Music of the Heart	Arranger, Orchestrator, Conductor	Wes Craven	Wrote string arrangement for "Turn the Page" by Aaliyah
1999	Detroit Rock City	Arranger, Orchestrator, Conductor	Adam Rifkin	Wrote string arrangement for "Nothing Can Keep Me from You" by Kiss
1999	Runaway Bride	Arranger, Orchestrator, Conductor	Garry Marshall	Wrote string arrangements for "Blue Eyes Blue" by Eric Clapton, "And That's What Hurts" by Hall & Oates, and "You Can't Hurry Love" by Dixie Chicks
1999	Big Daddy	Arranger, Conductor	Dennis Dugan	Wrote string arrangement for "What Is Life" by Shawn Mullins
1999	Tarzan	Arranger: Strings	Chris Buck, Kevin Lima	Phil Collins won the Oscar and Golden Globe for Best Original Song "You'll Be in My Heart"
1999	Austin Powers: The Spy Who Shagged Me	Arranger	Jay Roach	Wrote orchestra arrangements for "Espionage" by Green Day
1999	Cradle Will Rock	Arranger, Orchestrator, Conductor	Tim Robbins	Wrote string arrangements for Marc Blitzstein songs
1999	The Other Sister	Arranger, Orchestrator, Conductor	Garry Marshall	Wrote string arrangement for "Loving You Is All I Know" by The Pretenders
1999	Message in a Bottle	Arranger, Orchestrator, Conductor	Luis Mandoki	Wrote string arrangement for "Only Lonely" by Hootie & the Blowfish
1998	Playing by Heart	Arranger	Willard Carroll	Wrote string arrangement for "Walk Into This Room" by Ed Kowalczyk and Neneh Cherry
1998	Patch Adams	Arranger, Orchestrator, Conductor	Tom Shadyac	Wrote string arrangement for "Faith of the Heart" by Rod Stewart
1998	Everything That Rises	Orchestrator, Conductor	Dennis Quaid	
1998	Armageddon	Arranger, Orchestrator, Conductor	Michael Bay	Wrote string arrangement for "Leaving on a Jet Plane" by Chantal Kreviazuk
1998	Hope Floats	Arranger, Orchestrator, Conductor	Forest Whitaker	Wrote string arrangements for "Chances Are" by Bob Seger and Martina McBride "What Makes You Stay" by Deana Carter "To Get Me to You" by Lila McCann "Smile" by Lyle Lovett
1998	Savior	Arranger, Orchestrator	Predrag Antonijević	
1998	City of Angels	Arranger, Orchestrator, Conductor	Brad Silberling	Wrote string arrangements for "Uninvited" by Alanis Morissette and "Iris" by Goo Goo Dolls
1997	Boogie Nights	Arranger, Orchestrator, Conductor	Paul Thomas Anderson	Wrote string arrangement for "Lonely Boy" by Andrew Gold
1997	Gattaca	Arranger, Orchestrator, Conductor	Andrew Niccol	Wrote string arrangement for source music by Django Reinhardt
1996	Grace of My Heart	Arranger, Orchestrator, Conductor	Allison Anders	Wrote string arrangements for "Between Two Worlds" by Shawn Colvin, "Truth Is You Lied" by Jill Sobule, and songs by Kristen Vigard
1996	Unhook the Stars	Arranger	Nick Cassavetes	
1996	Phenomenon	Conductor, Arranger, Orchestrator	Jon Turteltaub	Wrote string arrangements for "Crazy Love" by Aaron Neville and "Have a Little Faith in Me" by Jewel
1996	Movies Money Murder	Composer	Stephen Eckelberry, Arthur Webb	
1995	Dead Man Walking	Orchestrator, Conductor	Tim Robbins	
1995	Boys on the Side	Arranger, Orchestrator, Conductor	Herbert Ross	Wrote strings arrangements for "You Got It" by Bonnie Raitt and "Somebody Stand by Me" by Stevie Nicks
1995	Mirage	Composer	Paul Williams	
1994	Color of Night	Arranger, Orchestrator, Conductor	Richard Rush	Wrote string arrangement for "The Color of the Night" by Lauren Christy
1994	Jimmy Hollywood	Arranger, Orchestrator, Conductor	Barry Levinson	Wrote string arrangement for "Let the Good Times Roll" by Robbie Robertson and Cassandra Wilson
1994	8 Seconds	Arranger, Conductor	John G. Avildsen	Wrote string arrangement for "You Hung the Moon" by Patty Smyth
1994	Backbeat	Composer: additional music	Iain Softley	
1993	Calendar Girl	Conductor, Arranger, Orchestrator	John Whitesell	Wrote string arrangement for "Out of My Dreams" by Aaron Neville
1993	Twenty Bucks	Orchestrator, Conductor	Keva Rosenfeld	
1992	Ginga Eiyuu Densetsu Gaiden -Ougon no Tsubasa-	Arranger	Tomoko Okada	
1992	Bob Roberts	Arranger, Orchestrator, Conductor	Tim Robbins	
1992	Wayne's World	Arranger, Orchestrator, Conductor	Penelope Spheeris	Wrote string arrangement for "Feed My Frankenstein" by Alice Cooper
1991	An American Tail: Fievel Goes West	Arranger, Orchestrator, Conductor	Phil Nibbelink, Simon Wells	Wrote string arrangement for "Dreams to Dream" by Linda Ronstadt
1990	Mermaids	Arranger, Orchestrator, Conductor	Richard Benjamin	Wrote string arrangements for Cher songs
1990	Days of Thunder	Arranger, Orchestrator, Conductor	Tony Scott	Wrote string arrangement for "Show Me Heaven" by Maria McKee
1989	Chances Are	Arranger, Orchestrator, Conductor	Emile Ardolino	Wrote string arrangement for "After All" by Cher and Peter Cetera
1989	Mind Games	Composer	Bob Yari	
1988	The Land Before Time	Arranger	Don Bluth	Wrote string arrangement for "If We Hold on Together" by Diana Ross
1986	Poltergeist II: The Other Side	Arranger, Conductor, Orchestrator	Brian Gibson	
1985	Murphy's Romance	Conductor, Orchestrator	Martin Ritt	
1985	Stand Alone	Composer	Alan Beattie	
1984	Breakin' Through	Composer	Peter Medak	
1984	Night of the Comet	Composer	Thom Eberhardt	
1983	All the Right Moves	Composer	Michael Chapman	
1982	The Plague Dogs	Orchestrator	Martin Rosen, Tony Guy	
1982	Puff and the Incredible Mr. Nobody	Composer	Fred Wolf	
1980	Thanksgiving in the Land of Oz	Composer: additional music	Charles Swenson, Fred Wolf	
1979	Puff the Magic Dragon in the Land of the Living Lies	Composer	Charles Swenson, Fred Wolf	
1979	The Rose	Conductor, Arranger, Orchestrator	Mark Rydell	
1978	Puff the Magic Dragon	Composer	Charles Swenson, Fred Wolf	Nomination: Primetime Emmy Award for Outstanding Individual Achievement – Animation Program (music)

== Personal life ==
Campbell has two sons with Bibbe Hansen: musician Beck Hansen, artist Channing Hansen, and one daughter, Alyssa Suede, with his current wife.

He is married to theatrical composer Pauline Frechette (aka Raven Kane).

Campbell is a long-time practicing Scientologist.

In 2012, he donated to Ron Paul's campaign in the United States Presidential election.

== See also ==
- List of music arrangers
