= Caño Paujil (disambiguation) =

Waterfalls with the name Caño (El) Paujil in Colombia

Caño (El) Paujil can refer to these waterfalls in Colombia:

1. Caño Paujil, Caquetá, 0.56795°S 72.44063°W
2. Caño El Paujil, Cesar, 9.46667°N 73.75°W
3. Caño Paujil, Cesar, 9.56941°N 73.49797°W
4. Caño Paujil, Meta, lat 3,76, long -73,83, 3.75749°N 73.8316°W
5. Caño Paujil, Meta, lat 4,01, long -72,36, 4.01194°N 72.36444°W
6. Caño Paujil, Meta, lat 4,03, long -73,75, 4.03064°N 73.74777°W
7. Caño Paujil, Vichada, 5.43086°N 68.14422°W
