= Colombia magia salvaje =

2015 documentary film by Mike Slee

- Directed by: Mike Slee
- Written by: Mike Slee
- Produced by: Karen Meehan
- Narrated by: Julio Sánchez Cristo
- Cinematography: Richard Kirby
- Edited by: Dan Schwalm
- Music by: David Campbell
- Production companies: Éxito Group; Ecoplanet Foundation; OFF The Fence
- Distributed by: Cine Colombia
- Release date: 10 September 2015
- Running time: 90 minutes
- Country: Colombia
- Budget: USD 3,5 million

Colombia magia salvaje (translatable into English as Colombia Wild Magic) is a Colombian documentary film released in 2015, directed by Mike Slee and produced for Éxito Group, by the Ecoplanet Foundation and the British firm Off The Fence. The film is a sample of the biodiversity of Colombia, recorded in 85 different locations to achieve the portrait of 20 ecosystems.

== Plot ==
The documentary covers part of Colombian biodiversity in a narrative that contrasts places such as the depths of the Pacific Ocean on Malpelo Island, the arrival of humpback whales every year to the Utría National Park in Chocó, the footprints of Ciudad Perdida in the Sierra Nevada de Santa Marta, the flight of the condor in the El Cocuy National Park, the páramos of the Andes, the Sierra de Chiribiquete and its cave paintings, the Eastern Plains, the Amazon and the Providencia Island, among other places. It also shows some species of national fauna such as crabs, Sloth, Cotton-top tamarin, Orinoco crocodile, arawana, jaguar and hummingbird.

== Production ==
The inspiration for the film was given thanks to the 2009 documentary film Home, which portrays the natural resources of 54 countries, but in which Colombia does not appear despite being the 2nd most biodiverse in the world, after neighbouring Brazil.

This inspiration led to the conception of a cinematographic project, unprecedented in Colombia especially for the technology involved in its production and the logistics to carry it out. The alliance for production was made between the Ecoplanet Foundation and Éxito Group.

Filming began in 2014 when an underwater camera operator spent a week in Malpelo Island and captured more than 150 minutes of hammerhead sharks in their natural habitat and continued with 9 weeks of shooting in the Amazon jungle. The footage presented in the film are portraits of the most hidden habitats in an immersion experience for the spectators. In total there were 38 species and 20 ecosystems portrayed in the film.

The team included 30 professionals from Off the Fence and 57 Colombians, who for 4 years toured Colombia under the direction of Mike Slee. In total the film cost 3.5 million dollars and by September 30, 2015 had raised 2.5 million dollars.

== Premiere ==
The first release of the film took place on September 9, 2015 in Nabusimake, capital of the Arhuaco indigenous people in northern Colombia and a sacred town where meetings are held to make decisions between the communities of the Sierra Nevada de Santa Marta. The community present there was able to attend a film screening for the first time, something totally unknown to many of them. The premiere in this place was held with the support of Ambulante, an NGO that organizes film screenings in various places. Although a quarter of the community does not understand Spanish because it only speaks the native language, they proved to understand the images projected on the screen.

The premiere of the film was held on September 10, 2015 at the Teatro Colón in Bogotá, with the presence of the producer and producer team as well as personalities such as Colombian President Juan Manuel Santos, Gabriel Vallejo (Minister of Environment), Carlos Mario Giraldo (President of the Éxito Group), Mariana Garcés (Minister of Culture) and Yesid Reyes (Minister of Justice) among other public figures.

== Topics ==
In 90 minutes, the filmmakers invite to discover or rediscover the "paradise that still exists" in the country with a tour that goes through the Sierra Nevada de Santa Marta and explores the lands of the Eastern Plains, Chocó, the Malpelo and Gorgona Islands, the Colombian Caribbean, the Chiribiquete mountain range, Providencia Island and the Andean region.

The producers described it as a film about the multitude of habitats but also about the environmental threats to which they are exposed. It also contains a conservation message. The film portrays the most prone to degradation ecosystems by human hands, including those that inhabit the jaguar and the golden frog, two of the most threatened species in the country.

The film portrays species like hummingbirds and sloths, which existence is in risk, particularly as a result of the elimination of the delicate ecosystems that have so far given them home and livelihood. In that sense, the film and its massive reproduction notify Colombians of the enormous responsibility they have to protect these unrecoverable spaces.

== Music ==
The creator of the film's original music is David Campbell, a composer with a career in soundtracks from movies like Spider-Man 2, Brokeback Mountain and World War Z. He was contacted by Colombian singer Juanes, with whom he has worked on 6 of his musical albums, who summoned him to create the music of the film. Under his direction was the mixture of the compositions of Carlos Vives, Juanes, Fonseca, ChocQuibTown, Walter Silva, Aterciopelados and Andrés Castro, all performed by the National Symphony Orchestra of Colombia. Each of the artists took a scene from the film as an inspiration for their composition and then Campbell chose where in the film he would use the music. According to him, the film has almost 90 minutes of music, which is unusual because normally the tapes have a maximum of 40 minutes of soundtrack.

== Reception ==
In its first weekend, the movie was seen by 328,786 (328.786 in Spanish) people in cinema, it was the most watched movie of that weekend. And by December 31, 2015 it was already the most watched Colombian film in the country, with 2,371,112 viewers.

In an interview with the newspaper El Espectador, Carlos Ogliastri of Royal Films ensures "any Colombian film that does not talk about drug trafficking, crimes, corrupt politicians and does not have a foul vocabulary, will be welcomed by all Colombians". "The great reception of this documentary shows that the national public is betting on other forms of representation of the country and that it sees in the cinema a way to raise awareness about issues that affect us all" said in the same article Adelfa Martínez, director of Proimagen Colombia.

The movie has aroused various discussions and criticisms regarding environmental policy decisions in Colombia, for alliances in its distribution and dissemination with different government entities, mainly the Ministry of Environment. Various opinion columns treat the subject of the film as a distraction from the country's environmental problem, which faces mining crises and controversial decisions about the use of land and resources both in cities and in protected reserves. There were also several positive opinion columns that appreciated the film for its contribution to the discussion of the danger and threats to country's biodiversity.
