= Beautiful Heartache =

Studio album by Oksana Grigorieva
- Released: November 2, 2009
- Recorded: 2009
- Genres: Pop; classical; traditional pop
- Length: 45:21
- Label: Icon
- Producers: Oksana Grigorieva; Mel Gibson

Beautiful Heartache is a 2009 studio album by Russian pianist and singer-songwriter, Oksana Grigorieva, with Mel Gibson as executive producer.

Grigorieva signed with Gibson's music label, and the two began production on her first album. She composed all songs on the album. Gibson served as co-writer on the song, "Say My Name," and recorded four music videos for the album's release. The album was positively received by the media, including ABC News and Reuters. IndieLondon gave the album a rating of 4 out of 5.

== Musician ==
Grigorieva was born in Saransk, Russia. Her parents were music professors. She grew up in Ukraine, and at the age of 15 moved to Moscow to attend university to learn piano. She said of her experience of learning music as a child, "Diplomas were everything. It wasn't unusual for students to play ten hours a day. Our skin would start to crack. We'd literally have bleeding fingers." Grigorieva finished conservatoire studies in Kazan, and moved to London where she continued her studies and taught music to others. After studying at the Royal College of Music, she moved to the United States and spent time living in New York City and Los Angeles, California. She taught music in the U.S., and patented a technique of instructing music notation to children. Grigorieva composed and performed music, and produced works for theatre and advertisements. A 2006 song she wrote, "Un Dia Llegara", became popular on the Josh Groban album, Awake; this garnered her recognition as a songwriter.

== Production ==
Grigorieva had signed with Gibson's music label prior to the album's release. The music project was made by the film production company Icon Entertainment, owned by Gibson. She wrote all of the songs on the album, and received a credit as producer with Gibson listed as executive producer. Grigorieva explained the choice of title for the album, in an interview with IndieLondon, "Well, one of the tracks on the album is called Beautiful Heartache ... everybody has a heartbreak at some point in their lives. It’s how you deal with it that’s important. So, I guess I was drawn to that notion for the album title."

In an interview with The Times, she commented, "I'm very lucky they offered me the chance to follow my dreams, but also to allow me to produce my own album, which is hardly ever offered to first-time artists. He believes in me that much. I'm really blessed ... It's the most incredible gift that Mr Gibson could have given me." She acknowledged to the Herald Sun that it was helpful to have Gibson's production company assist with her music career, "If you think about it, every talent needs a serious push and help from somebody who is stronger, because it's pretty much impossible for anybody to succeed in this industry. So I've become very lucky, and I'm very grateful. You don't control the situations or the people you meet. I did not plan this. I'm just doing what I've always been doing. It's not like I've changed my goals at all."

Gibson contributed lyrics to multiple tracks on the album. The track, "Say My Name", was co-written by Grigorieva and Gibson. Grigorieva described "Say My Name", stating, "It is naked, intimate, raw emotion. It is the first and one of the simplest songs on the album, but also one of the most intimate." She characterized it as, "little more than piano and voice as if it is a cry from the soul". Gibson provided guest vocals for two tracks on the album. Grigorieva stated of Gibson's singing on the album, "Mel is an incredible artist. He has a great voice. He is a visionary. He enabled me to produce this, for my music to live."

Gibson served as director of four music videos intended to accompany the release of the album. The music videos were filmed over a seven-day period in Mexico. Grigorieva stated of working with Gibson as a music video director, "I kept asking him, 'Please, give me directions!' I said, 'You can yell at me if you want to'. But he said, 'No, you're doing just fine. You're a good actor'. He was very much into his own world, painting pictures with the camera." In describing the music videos, she observed, "They're like dramatic miniature films a whirlpool of different, exciting, bright images." Grigorieva toured to promote her album, during October 2009. The first single from the album, "Say My Name", was released in June 2009 on the website People.com as a listening exclusive. Beautiful Heartache was released on November 2, 2009. It was made available in 2009 on iTunes, and via download on the musician's official website, at www.oksana.fm.

== Contents ==
Beautiful Heartache was marketed as "grown-up, piano-led pop, heavy on classical motifs". The first single released for the album was titled, "Say My Name". A music video for the second single released from the album featured Grigorieva on the piano, as well as portraying an assistant to a knife-thrower. The album includes a title track, "Beautiful Heartache", with lyrics including: "I love the way you wear your skin." The music video for the track, "Beautiful Heartache", focused on a tango theme.

== Critical reception ==
Professional ratings
Review scores
Source	Rating
IndieLondon	4/5 stars

ABC News reported that Beautiful Heartache garnered the singer "rave reviews" from music critics. Reuters commented of the album, "'Beautiful Heartache' features a collection of wistful love songs, blending shimmering string arrangements with pop and jazz-influenced arrangements that showcase Grigorieva's soulful voice." In a review of the album, Jack Foley of IndieLondon gave it a rating of 4 out of 5, and observed, "throughout, she displays a keen ear for melody, for honest emotional simplicity and classic values. She’s well worth taking the time to check out". The track from the album co-written with Mel Gibson, "Say My Name", was not generally well received by music critics, and received negative comments from listeners at the website E! Online.

== Track listing ==
All lyrics are written by Oksana Grigorieva;; all music is composed by Oksana Grigorieva; "Say My Name" co-written with Mel Gibson.

Beautiful Heartache
No.	Title	Length
1.	"Say My Name"	3:48
2.	"Flying Upside Down"	3:48
3.	"When It's Over"	4:07
4.	"Evening With Daddy"	4:46
5.	"Angel"	3:53
6.	"Beautiful Heartache"	3:53
7.	"Back From Russia"	4:42
8.	"What Kind of Love Is This?"	4:18
9.	"Ain't Right"	4:22
10.	"Love Goes On"	4:45
11.	"Dark Eyes (Ochi Chernye)"	2:59
Total length:		45:21

== Personnel ==
Composition

- Oksana Grigorieva – writing, composition
- Mel Gibson – co-writer, "Say My Name"

Accompaniment

- Matt Chamberlain – drums
- Paul Bushnell – bass
- Lyle Workman – guitar
- Greg Suran – guitar
- Jamie Muhoberac – keyboard
- David Campbell – string arrangements and conducting

== See also ==
- Awake
- List of classical pianists
- List of Russian people
