= Timothy Dalton on stage and screen =

Timothy Dalton has appeared on stage and in films.

== Films ==
Year	Title	Role	Notes
1968	The Lion in Winter	Philip II	
1970	Cromwell	Prince Rupert of the Rhine	
1970	The Voyeur	Mark	
1970	Wuthering Heights	Heathcliff	
1971	Mary, Queen of Scots	Henry Stuart, Lord Darnley	
1975	Permission to Kill	Charles Lord	
1978	The Man Who Knew Love	Juan de Dios	Also known as: El hombre que supo amar
1978	Sextette	Sir Michael Barrington	
1979	Agatha	Col. Archie Christie	
1980	Flash Gordon	Prince Barin	
1981	Chanel Solitaire	Boy Capel	
1985	The Doctor and the Devils	Doctor Thomas Rock	
1987	The Living Daylights	James Bond	
1988	Hawks	Bancroft	
1989	Brenda Starr	Basil St. John	Shot in 1986
1989	Licence to Kill	James Bond	
1990	The King's Whore	King Vittorio Amadeo	
1991	The Rocketeer	Neville Sinclair	
1993	Naked in New York	Elliot Price	
1993	Last Action Hero	Himself	Cameo
1996	Salt Water Moose	Lester Parnell	
1997	The Beautician and the Beast	Boris Pochenko	
1997	The Informant	DCI Rennie	
1999	Made Men	Sheriff Dex Drier	
2001	American Outlaws	Allan Pinkerton	
2003	Looney Tunes: Back in Action	Damien Drake	
2006	Tales from Earthsea	Ged / Sparrowhawk	Voice; English dub
2007	Hot Fuzz	Simon Skinner	
2010	Toy Story 3	Mr. Pricklepants	Voice
2010	The Tourist	Chief Inspector Jones	
2011	Hawaiian Vacation	Mr. Pricklepants	Voice. Short subjects
2011	Small Fry	Mr. Pricklepants	Voice. Short subjects
2012	Partysaurus Rex	Mr. Pricklepants	Voice. Short subjects
2012	Secret of the Wings	Lord Milori	Voice
2019	Toy Story 4	Mr. Pricklepants	Voice

== Television ==
Year	Programme	Role	Notes
1966	Troilus and Cressida	Diomedes	Television film
1967	Sat'day While Sunday	Peter	10 episodes
1968	The Three Princes	Ahmed	Television film
1969	Judge Dee	(unknown)	Episode: "A Place of Great Evil"
1970	Play of the Month	Clive Harrington	Episode: "Five Finger Exercise"
1971	Play of the Month	Marchbanks	Episode: "Candida"
1978–1979	Centennial	Oliver Seccombe	Miniseries; 10 episodes
1979	Charlie's Angels	Damien Roth	Episode: "Fallen Angel"
1979	The Flame Is Love	Marquis de Guaita	Television film
1983	Jane Eyre	Edward Fairfax Rochester	Miniseries; 9 episodes
1984	The Master of Ballantrae	Col. Francis Burke	Television film
1984	Mistral's Daughter	Perry Kilkullen	Miniseries; 3 episodes
1984	Antony and Cleopatra	Mark Antony	Television film
1985	Faerie Tale Theatre	Narrator	Voice; Episode: "The Emperor's New Clothes"
1985	Florence Nightingale	Richard Milnes	Television film
1986	Sins	Edmund Junot	Miniseries; 3 episodes
1987	Survival Factor	Host	Voice. Miniseries; 6 episodes
1992	Tales from the Crypt	Lokai	Episode: "Werewolf Concerto"
1992	Framed	Eddie Myers	Miniseries; 4 episodes
1993	In the Wild	Host	Episode: "Wolves with Timothy Dalton"
1994	Lie Down with Lions	Jack Carver	Television film. Also known as: Red Eagle
1994	Scarlett	Rhett Butler	Miniseries; 4 episodes
1998	Stories from My Childhood	Prince Guidon	Voice. Episode: "The Prince, the Swan and the Czar Saltan"
1998	ESU Emergency Services Unit	Narrator	Voice
1999	Cleopatra	Julius Caesar	Miniseries; 2 episodes
1999	The Reef	Charles Darrow	Television film
2000	Time Share	Matthew "Matt" Farragher	Television film. Also known as: Bitter Sweet
2000	Possessed	Father William Bowdern	Television film
2004	Dunkirk	Narrator	3 episodes
2005	Hercules	Amphitryon	Miniseries; 2 episodes
2006	Agatha Christie's Marple	Clive Trevelyan	Episode: "The Sittaford Mystery"
2008	Unknown Sender	Miles	Episode: "If You're Seeing This Tape..."
2009–2010	Doctor Who	Lord President Rassilon, The Narrator	Episodes: "The End of Time: Parts One & Two"
2010–2011	Chuck	Alexei Volkoff, Hartley Winterbottom	6 episodes
2013	Toy Story of Terror!	Mr. Pricklepants	Voice. Television films
2014	Toy Story That Time Forgot	Mr. Pricklepants	Voice. Television films
2014–2016	Penny Dreadful	Sir Malcolm	Seasons 1–3; 25 episodes
2019–2020	Tangled: The Series	Lord Demanitus	Voice. Episodes: "Lost and Found" & "Plus Est En Vous"
2019–2023	Doom Patrol	Niles Caulder / Chief	Lead role (Season 1–2); Guest (Season 3–4); 27 episodes
2022	The Crown	Peter Townsend	Episode: "Annus Horribilis"
2023–2025	1923	Donald Whitfield	Seasons 1–2; 9 episodes

== Audiobooks ==
Novels by "Benjamin Black" (pseudonym of John Banville):

Year	Title	Publisher
2007	Christine Falls	AudioRenaissance
2008	The Silver Swan	Macmillan Audio
2010	Elegy for April	Macmillan Audio

== Stage ==
Year	Play	Role	Theatre	Notes
1964	Coriolanus		Queen's Theatre, London	with the National Youth Theatre
1966	A Game Called Arthur	Arthur	Royal Court Theatre, London	
1966	Little Malcolm And His Struggle Against The Eunuchs	Malcolm	Royal Court Theatre, London	with the National Youth Theatre
1966	The Merchant of Venice		Birmingham Repertory Theatre	with the Birmingham Repertory Theatre Company
1966	Richard III	Richard III	Birmingham Repertory Theatre	with the Birmingham Repertory Theatre Company
1966	As You Like It		Birmingham Repertory Theatre	with the Birmingham Repertory Theatre Company
1966	Love's Labour's Lost		Birmingham Repertory Theatre	with the Birmingham Repertory Theatre Company
1966	The Doctor's Dilemma		Birmingham Repertory Theatre	with the Birmingham Repertory Theatre Company
1966	St. Joan		Birmingham Repertory Theatre	with the Birmingham Repertory Theatre Company
1971	A Game Called Arthur	Arthur	Theatre Upstairs, London	
1971	Macbeth	Macbeth		Hawaii production
1972	King Lear	Edgar	Aldwych Theatre, London	with the Prospect Theatre Company
1972	Love's Labour's Lost	Berowne	Aldwych Theatre, London	with the Prospect Theatre Company
1972	Henry V			
1972–1973	Romeo and Juliet		Aldwych Theatre, London	with the Prospect Theatre Company
1973	Romeo and Juliet	Romeo	Royal Shakespeare Theatre, Stratford-upon-Avon	with the Royal Shakespeare Company
1973	Love's Labour's Lost		Royal Shakespeare Theatre, Stratford-upon-Avon	with the Royal Shakespeare Company
1974	Henry IV, Part 1	Henry, Prince of Wales	Round House Theatre	with the Prospect Theatre Company
1974	Henry IV, Part 2	Henry, Prince of Wales	Round House Theatre	with the Prospect Theatre Company
1974	Henry V	Henry V of England	Round House Theatre	with the Prospect Theatre Company
1975	The Samaritan	Bob	Shaw Theatre, London	
1975	The Vortex	Nicky Lancaster	Greenwich Theatre, London	
1976	Black Comedy	Harold Gorringe	Shaw Theatre, London	with the Dolphin Theatre Company
1976	White Lies	Tom	Shaw Theatre, London	with the Dolphin Theatre Company
1977	The Lunatic, the Lover, and Poet	Lord Byron	The Old Vic	with the Old Vic Theatre Company
1977	The Romans	Marc Antony	New Mermaid Theatre	
1981	Antony and Cleopatra			
1982	Henry IV, Part 1	Harry Percy	Barbican Centre, London	with the Royal Shakespeare Company
1982	Henry IV, Part 2	Harry Percy	Barbican Centre, London	with the Royal Shakespeare Company
1986	Antony and Cleopatra	Marc Antony	Theatr Clwyd, Mold	subsequently at the Haymarket Theatre, London
1986	The Taming of the Shrew	Petruchio	Theatr Clwyd, Mold	subsequently at the Haymarket Theatre, London
1988	A Touch of the Poet	Cornelius Melody	Young Vic, London	subsequently at the Haymarket Theatre, London
1991	Love Letters	Andrew Makepeace Ladd III	Canon Theatre, Beverly Hills	
1994	Peter and the Wolf	Narrator	Hollywood Bowl, Los Angeles	Staged reading
1998	Star Crossed Lovers			
2003–2004	His Dark Materials	Lord Asriel	Royal National Theatre, London	with the National Theatre Company
