= Timothy Dalton =

British actor (born 1946)

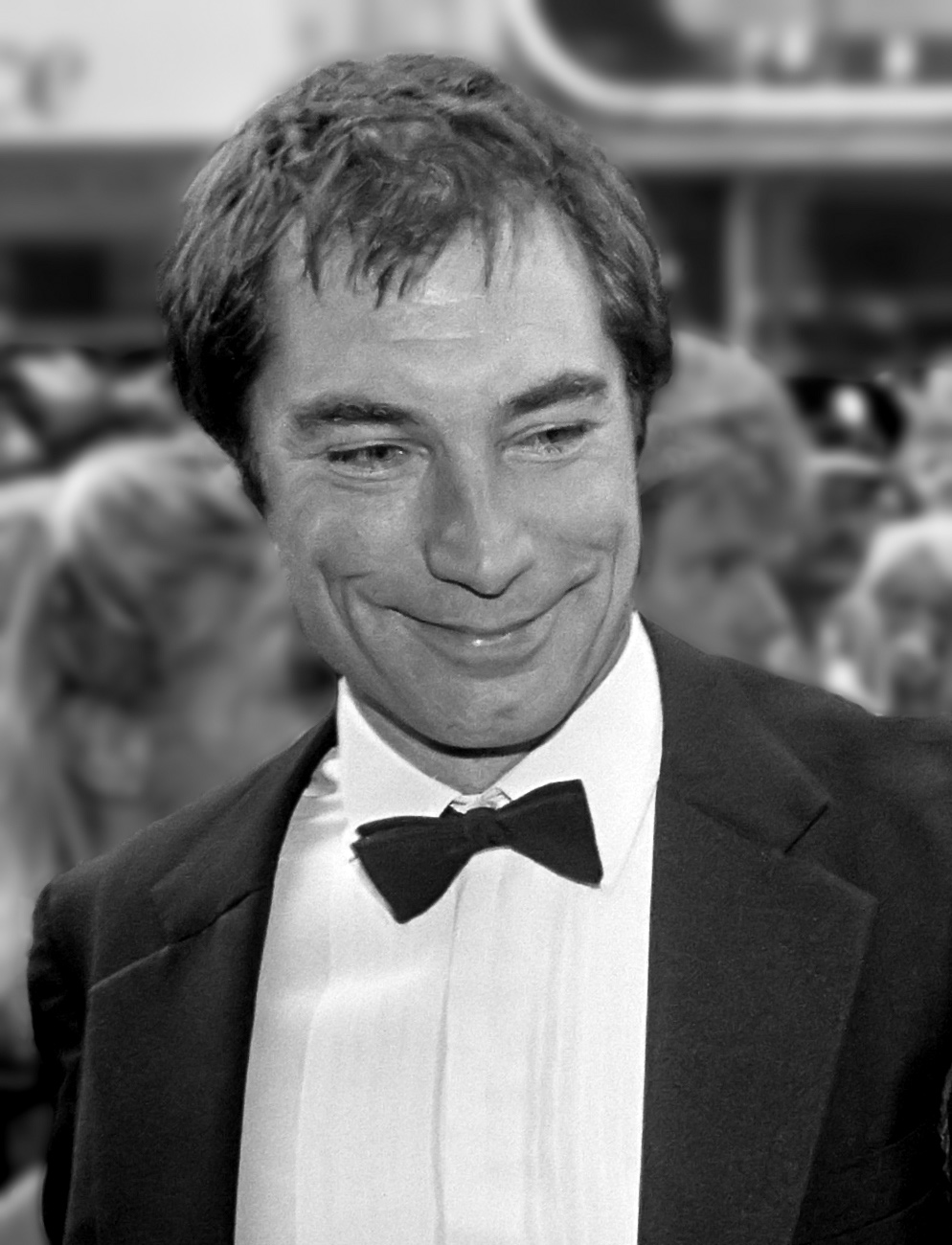
- Dalton in 1987
- Born: Timothy Leonard Dalton Leggett; 21 March 1946 (age 80); Colwyn Bay, Denbighshire, Wales
- Education: Royal Academy of Dramatic Art (RADA)
- Occupation: Actor
- Years active: 1964–present
- Works: Full list
- Partners: Vanessa Redgrave (1971–1986); Oksana Grigorieva (1995–2003)
- Children: 1

Timothy Leonard Dalton Leggett (/ˈdɔːltən/; born 21 March 1946) is a British actor. He gained international prominence as the fourth actor to portray fictional secret agent James Bond in the Eon Productions film series, starring in The Living Daylights (1987) and Licence to Kill (1989).

Beginning his career on stage, he made his film debut as Philip II of France in the 1968 historical drama The Lion in Winter. He took roles in the period films Wuthering Heights (1970), Cromwell (1970), and Mary, Queen of Scots (1971). Dalton also appeared in the films Flash Gordon (1980), The Rocketeer (1991), Looney Tunes: Back in Action (2003), Hot Fuzz (2007) and The Tourist (2010). He voices Mr. Pricklepants in the Toy Story franchise (2010–present).

On television, Dalton's role as Oliver Secombe made him one of the stars of Centennial (1978–1979). He later played Mr. Rochester in the BBC serial Jane Eyre (1983), Rhett Butler in the CBS miniseries Scarlett (1994), Rassilon in the BBC One sci-fi series Doctor Who (2009–2010), Sir Malcolm Murray on the Showtime horror drama Penny Dreadful (2014–2016), the Chief on the DC Universe/Max superhero series Doom Patrol (2019–2023), and Donald Whitfield on the Paramount+ western series 1923 (2023–2025). He portrayed Peter Townsend in the fifth season of The Crown (2022).

== Early life ==
Timothy Leonard Dalton Leggett was born on 21 March 1946 in Colwyn Bay, Wales, to an English father, Peter Dalton Leggett, who was a captain in the Special Operations Executive (SOE) during the Second World War and was an advertising executive at the time of his son's birth; and an American mother, Dorothy Scholes, of Italian and Irish descent.

Before Dalton's fourth birthday, the family moved back to England to Belper in Derbyshire, where he attended Herbert Strutt Grammar School. The family moved again and, as a teenager, he was a member of the Air Training Corps at LXX (Croft & Culcheth) Squadron, north of Warrington.

He decided to become an actor at 16 after seeing a production of Macbeth and got a role in a production of the play at The Old Vic. He left school in 1962 at 16 to enroll in the Royal Academy of Dramatic Art and tour with the National Youth Theatre. Dalton did not complete his RADA studies, leaving the academy in 1966 to join the ensemble of the Birmingham Repertory Theatre. He had ambitions of being an actor, which pleased his father; "It pleased everybody on my father's side of the family. My mother and her side, however, were worried. None of them felt acting was a secure profession for a young man."

== Career ==
Dalton quickly moved to television, working mainly with the BBC, and in 1968 made his film debut as Philip II of France in The Lion in Winter. This was the first of several period dramas, which included a remake of Wuthering Heights in 1970 in which he portrayed Heathcliff, and the English Civil War drama Cromwell as Cavalier commander Prince Rupert of the Rhine. After a few more films, Dalton took a break in 1971 to concentrate on the theatre, performing with the Royal Shakespeare Company and other troupes throughout the world. In 1975, Dalton and Vivien Merchant headed the cast of a revival of Noël Coward's The Vortex.

With two exceptions, the films Mary, Queen of Scots (1971) and Permission to Kill (1975), he remained a theatre actor until 1978. That year he starred in Sextette as the husband of 85-year-old Mae West, hailing his return to cinema and the beginning of his American career. While in the United States, Dalton worked mainly in television, although he starred in several films. During this time, he played Prince Barin in the science fiction film Flash Gordon (1980) and played Mr. Rochester in a BBC serial of Jane Eyre (1983). Dalton starred alongside Jonathan Pryce in the film The Doctor and the Devils (1985).

Dalton co-starred with Joan Collins in the miniseries, Sins (1986). He was also replaced in two films in which he had been signed to appear. He was offered the role of real-life British Prime Minister William Lamb in the film Lady Caroline Lamb. The filmmakers replaced him with Jon Finch at the last moment; Dalton sued for breach of contract and won an out-of-court settlement.

In 1985, Dalton was set to play Don Alfonso de la Torré in Roman Polanski's film Pirates. The two men did not get along, so Polanski replaced Dalton with Damien Thomas. Dalton co-starred with Anthony Edwards in the 1988 British comedy film Hawks about two terminally ill patients who set off on a road-trip together.

=== James Bond (1986–1994) ===
==== Initial offers ====
Dalton had been considered for the role of James Bond several times. According to the documentary Inside The Living Daylights, the producers first approached Dalton in 1968 for On Her Majesty's Secret Service although Dalton himself in this same documentary claims the approach occurred when he was either 24 or 25 and had already done the film Mary, Queen of Scots (1971), so it has been speculated that it was more likely for Live and Let Die, the film in which Roger Moore made his debut as Bond after Sean Connery in Diamonds Are Forever. Dalton declined the offer and told the producers that he was too young for the role. In a 1987 interview, Dalton said, "Originally I did not want to take over from Sean Connery. He was far too good, he was wonderful. I was about 24 or 25, which is too young. But when you've seen Bond from the beginning, you don't take over from Sean Connery." In either 1979 or 1980, during pre-production of For Your Eyes Only he was approached again, but did not favour the direction the films were taking, nor did he think the producers were seriously looking for a new 007. As he explained, his idea of Bond was different. In a 1979 episode of the television series Charlie's Angels, Dalton played the role of Damien Roth, a millionaire playboy described by David Doyle's character as "almost James Bond-ian".

In August 1986, Dalton was approached to play Bond after Roger Moore had retired, but as Dalton would soon begin filming Brenda Starr he could do The Living Daylights only if the Bond producers waited six weeks. The producers were not willing to wait and offered the role to Pierce Brosnan. However, when news of Brosnan's hiring was leaked, the makers of television series Remington Steele, in which Brosnan starred, exercised their right to renew the series, and the offer to Brosnan was withdrawn. Having now completed the filming of Brenda Starr, Dalton was now available and he accepted the part of Bond for The Living Daylights.

==== Films ====
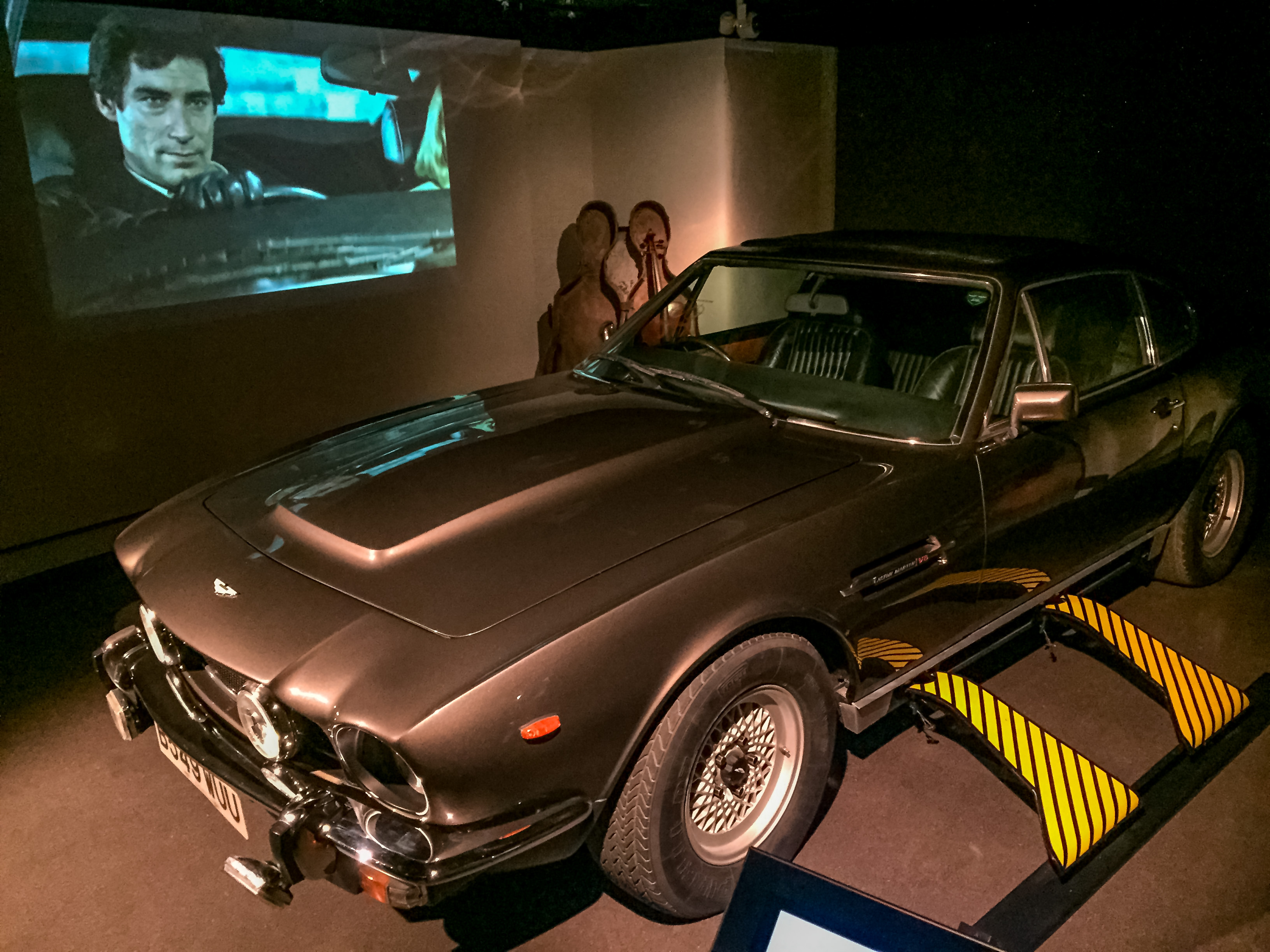
Exhibition showcasing the Aston Martin V8 Vantage which Dalton drove in The Living Daylights film

Dalton's first appearance as 007, The Living Daylights (1987), was critically successful, grossing more than either of the previous two Bond films with Moore (Octopussy (1983) and A View to a Kill (1985)) as well as contemporary box-office rivals such as Die Hard and Lethal Weapon. His second film, Licence to Kill (1989), although almost as successful as its predecessor in most markets, did not perform as well at the U.S. box office, in large part due to a lacklustre marketing campaign, whereby the title of the film was abruptly changed from Licence Revoked. The main factor for the lack of success in the U.S. was that it was released at the same time as the hugely successful Indiana Jones and the Last Crusade, Tim Burton's Batman, and Lethal Weapon 2, during the summer blockbuster season. In the United Kingdom, one of its critical markets, the film was also hampered by receiving a 15 certificate from the British Board of Film Classification, which severely affected its commercial success. Future Bond films, following the resolution of legal and other issues, were all released between 31 October and mid-December, in order to avoid the risk of a summer failure, as had happened to Licence to Kill.

With a worldwide gross of US$191 million, The Living Daylights became the fourth-most-successful Bond film at the time of its release. In 1998, the second Deluxe Edition of Bond's soundtracks was released. The Living Daylights was one of the first soundtracks to receive Deluxe treatment. The booklet/poster of this CD contains MGM's quote about The Living Daylights being the fourth-most-successful Bond film.

Since Dalton was contracted for three Bond films, the pre-production of his third film began in 1990, in order to be released in 1991. What was confirmed is that the story would deal with the destruction of a chemical weapons laboratory in Scotland, and the events would take place in London, Tokyo and Hong Kong. The film was cancelled due to legal issues between UA/MGM and Eon Productions, which lasted for four years.

The legal battle ended in 1993, and Dalton was expected to return as James Bond in the next Bond film, which later became GoldenEye. Since his contract had expired, negotiations with him to renew it took place. Dalton surprised everyone on 12 April 1994 with the announcement that he would not return as James Bond. At this time, he was shooting the miniseries Scarlett. Two months later, Brosnan, who had been hired to succeed Moore when Dalton had turned down the role in 1986, was announced as the new Bond. Dalton reflected in 2007, "I was supposed to make one more, but it was cancelled because MGM and the film's producers got into a lawsuit which lasted for five years. After that, I didn't want to do it anymore."

==== Dalton as Bond ====
Dalton portrayed Bond in The Living Daylights (1987) and Licence to Kill (1989), the fifteenth and sixteenth entries in the franchise. Unlike Moore, who had played Bond as more of a light-hearted playboy, Dalton's portrayal of Bond was darker and more serious. Dalton pushed for renewed emphasis on the gritty realism of Ian Fleming's novels instead of fantasy plots and humour.

I think Roger was fine as Bond, but the films had become too much techno-pop and had lost track of their sense of story. I mean, every film seemed to have a villain who had to rule or destroy the world. If you want to believe in the fantasy on screen, then you have to believe in the characters and use them as a stepping-stone to lead you into this fantasy world. That's a demand I made, and Albert Broccoli agreed with me.

— Dalton stated in a 1989 interview.

A fan of the literary character, often seen re-reading and referring to the novels on set, Dalton determined to approach the role and play truer to the original character described by Fleming. His 007, therefore, came across as a reluctant agent who did not always enjoy the assignments he was given, something seen on screen before, albeit obliquely, only in George Lazenby's On Her Majesty's Secret Service. In The Living Daylights, for example, Bond tells a critical colleague, Saunders, "Stuff my orders! ... Tell M what you want. If he fires me, I'll thank him for it." This was an element that appealed to Dalton when he read the script. In Licence to Kill, he resigns from the Secret Intelligence Service in order to pursue his own agenda of revenge.

Unlike Moore, who always seems to be in command, Dalton's Bond sometimes looks like a candidate for the psychiatrist's couch – a burned-out killer who may have just enough energy left for one final mission. That was Fleming's Bond – a man who drank to diminish the poison in his system, the poison of a violent world with impossible demands. ... His is the suffering Bond.

— Steven Jay Rubin writes in The Complete James Bond Movie Encyclopaedia (1995).

This approach proved to be a double-edged sword. Film critics and fans of Fleming's original novels welcomed a more serious interpretation after more than a decade of Moore's approach. However, Dalton's films were criticised for their comparative lack of humour. Dalton's serious interpretation was not only in portraying the character, but also in performing most of the stunts of the action scenes himself. His director, John Glen, commented "Tim is a very convincing James Bond. When he has a gun in his hand, you believe he really could kill someone. I don't think that was ever the case with Roger Moore."

Some modern critics have compared Dalton to Daniel Craig. In 2006, Gwladys Fouché of The Guardian wrote "while Connery was cool, and Brosnan brilliant, only Dalton could show the dark side of Fleming's fearless agent. ... [Bond producers] want Bond to be closer to the original Ian Fleming character. They want him to be grittier, darker and less jokey. What they really want, it seems, is to have Dalton back." Dalton himself has claimed that the Bond films starring Daniel Craig are "believable" in the way he wanted his own Bond films to be:

I came in under certain circumstances. The prevailing wisdom at the time – which I would say I shared – was that the series, whilst very entertaining, had become rather spoof-like. It was one-liners and raised eyebrows and it had become, let's say, too lighthearted. And the producer, Mr. Broccoli, felt that, and he wanted to try to bring it back to something more like its original roots with those Sean Connery films. I had loved them all, and I had loved the books. ... So that was the loose framework that we sort of embarked on, but then you find that nobody else wants to change it all! The studio doesn't want to change it, the people that work on it don't want to change it ... Everyone's happy with what they know. And everyone intellectually says, "Well, yes, we should, it was getting a bit stale, it was getting a bit this, that, and the other," but nobody actually wants to. So it wasn't as easy as one would hope. I mean, now they have. I think now, with Daniel [Craig], they have. But that was, what, almost 20 years later that they actually embarked on something more believable?

Of his time as Bond, Dalton recalled:

I should be careful what I say, because, of course, everyone is interested in Bond. It's almost like a bracket or a bubble in one's life. Everybody treats the idea of a Bond film different to anything else. I mean, journalists come knowing the story they want to write, whereas on a normal piece of work we're all discovering what to write about. We're discovering what we're acting. It's part of the creative process. But in a Bond movie? No. People know what they want to write about. And they know, really, what they want. Everyone's got an opinion, from the top of the studio down to the guy in the street. But you're sort of ... outside. No one, no matter how well someone can communicate, can tell you – and I certainly can't really communicate accurately – what it is like to be the actor playing James Bond. The only actors who can are the other actors who've played the part. It's kind of astonishing, really. You are in kind of a bubble. It's real, it's valuable, it's exciting, and it can give great pleasure. And yet it's somehow unreal. No, forget the "unreal" bit. But it's somehow outside the normal course of what we all share in ... A fantastic experience.

His time as Bond allowed him to work on projects that were of interest to him; "Hawks deals with the subject of extraordinary relevance: Why does it take a crisis to make you realize how bloody precious life is? Unfortunately, it's about cancer, which is a not a word the film business thinks of as being particularly commercial. Still, doing the first Bond film enabled me to get Hawks made. Doing the Bond film helped the O'Neill play find an audience. This is a commercial business. If you have a commercial success, you have enhanced viability."

=== Post-Bond career ===
After his Bond films, Dalton divided his work between stage, television and films, and diversified the characters he played. This helped him eliminate the 007 typecasting that followed him during the previous period. Dalton was nevertheless for a certain period considered for a part in the Bond film GoldenEye. Instead, he played Nazi spy Neville Sinclair in The Rocketeer (1991), and Rhett Butler in Scarlett, the television miniseries sequel to Gone with the Wind. He also appeared as criminal informant Eddie Myers in the acclaimed British television film Framed (1992). He had a major part in an episode of the television series Tales from the Crypt.

During the second half of the 1990s he starred in several cable films, most notably the Irish Republican Army drama The Informant and the action thriller Made Men. In the television film Cleopatra (1999) he played Julius Caesar. He played a parody of James Bond named Damian Drake in the film Looney Tunes: Back in Action (2003). At the end of that year and the beginning of 2004, he returned to theatre to play Lord Asriel in the stage version of His Dark Materials. Dalton played Simon Skinner, who ran the local supermarket, in the action comedy film Hot Fuzz, which was released in 2007.

Dalton returned once again to British television in a guest role for the Doctor Who 2009–2010 two-part special "The End of Time", playing Rassilon. He was first heard in the role narrating a preview clip shown at the 2009 Comic Convention. In 2010 and 2011, he starred in several episodes of the fourth season of the American spy comedy Chuck as Alexei Volkoff.

Dalton voiced the character Mr. Pricklepants in Toy Story 3 (2010) and again in the television specials Toy Story of Terror! (2013) and Toy Story That Time Forgot (2014), and the sequel Toy Story 4 (2019). In 2012, Dalton voiced Lord Milori in Secret of the Wings, as part of the Disney Fairies franchise and the fourth film direct-to-DVD instalment of the Tinker Bell film series.

From 2014 to 2016, Dalton portrayed the character Sir Malcolm Murray for three seasons on the Showtime original television series Penny Dreadful.

From 2019 to 2021, Dalton portrayed the Chief in the DC Universe / HBO Max superhero series Doom Patrol.

== Personal life ==
Dalton was in a relationship with reporter Kate Adie as a youth, and with actress Vanessa Redgrave (with whom he appeared in the 1971 film Mary, Queen of Scots and the 1979 film Agatha) between 1971 and 1986. He briefly dated actresses Stefanie Powers and Whoopi Goldberg.

He was in a relationship with musician Oksana Grigorieva in the 1990s; they met in 1995 while she was employed as a translator for filmmaker Nikita Mikhalkov. Dalton and Grigorieva had a son together, born in 1997. They broke up around 2003.

Dalton has residences in Chiswick in London; West Hollywood, California; and St. John's, Antigua and Barbuda.

Dalton is a Manchester City F.C. supporter, and is often seen at the Etihad Stadium to watch the team play.
