= Serranía de Chiribiquete =

Mountains in Colombia

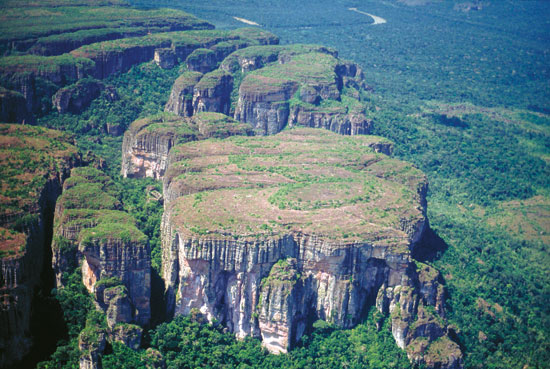
- Aerial view of Chiribiquete

Highest point
- Peak: Cerro Chiribiquete
- Elevation: 800 m (2,600 ft)
- Coordinates: 1°19′39″N 72°45′41″W

Dimensions
- Length: 125 km (78 mi)
- Width: 30 km (19 mi)

Geography
- Location within Colombia
- Country: Colombia
- Region(s): Caquetá, Guaviare

UNESCO World Heritage Site
- Official name: Chiribiquete National Park – “The Maloca of the Jaguar”
- Type: Cultural and Natural
- Criteria: (iii), (ix), (x)
- Designated: 2018
- Reference no.: 1174
- Region: South America

The Serranía de Chiribiquete or Chiribiquete Mountains are a group of isolated table mountains in the Amazon Region of Colombia. The mountains are part of the western edge of the Guiana Shield. The area is protected as a national park. This area is habitat for the Chiribiquete emerald (Chlorostilbon olivaresi), an endemic hummingbird. The waterfall Caño Paujil originates from the Serranía de Chiribiquete.

== Protected area ==
Chiribiquete National Park is the largest national park in Colombia and the largest tropical rainforest national park in the world. It covers about 43,000 km^{2} (17,000 sq mi) and hosts important archaeological evidence in the form of rock art. More than 600,000 traces of around 20,000 petroglyphs and pictographs have been discovered in the mountain chain, the oldest of which may date to 20,000 years BP. The rock art has been produced until the 16th century. The rock paintings were first recorded by the American botanist Richard Evans Schultes in the 1940s. Later investigations were carried out by Thomas van der Hammen.

British wildlife filmmaker Mike Slee and Colombian photographer and explorer Francisco Forero Bonell photographed and filmed the rock paintings on the vertical rock faces within the park in 2014. Serranía de Chiribiquete is featured in the 2015 documentary Colombia, magia salvaje, which was made by producer, Allison Bean and director, Mike Slee.

Colombian president Juan Manuel Santos announced that Chiribiquete National Natural Park would be expanded by 15,000 km^{2} (5,800 sq mi) on 21 February, 2018. The park was expanded to 43,000 km^{2} (17,000 sq mi) and declared a World Heritage Site by UNESCO on 2 July, 2018.

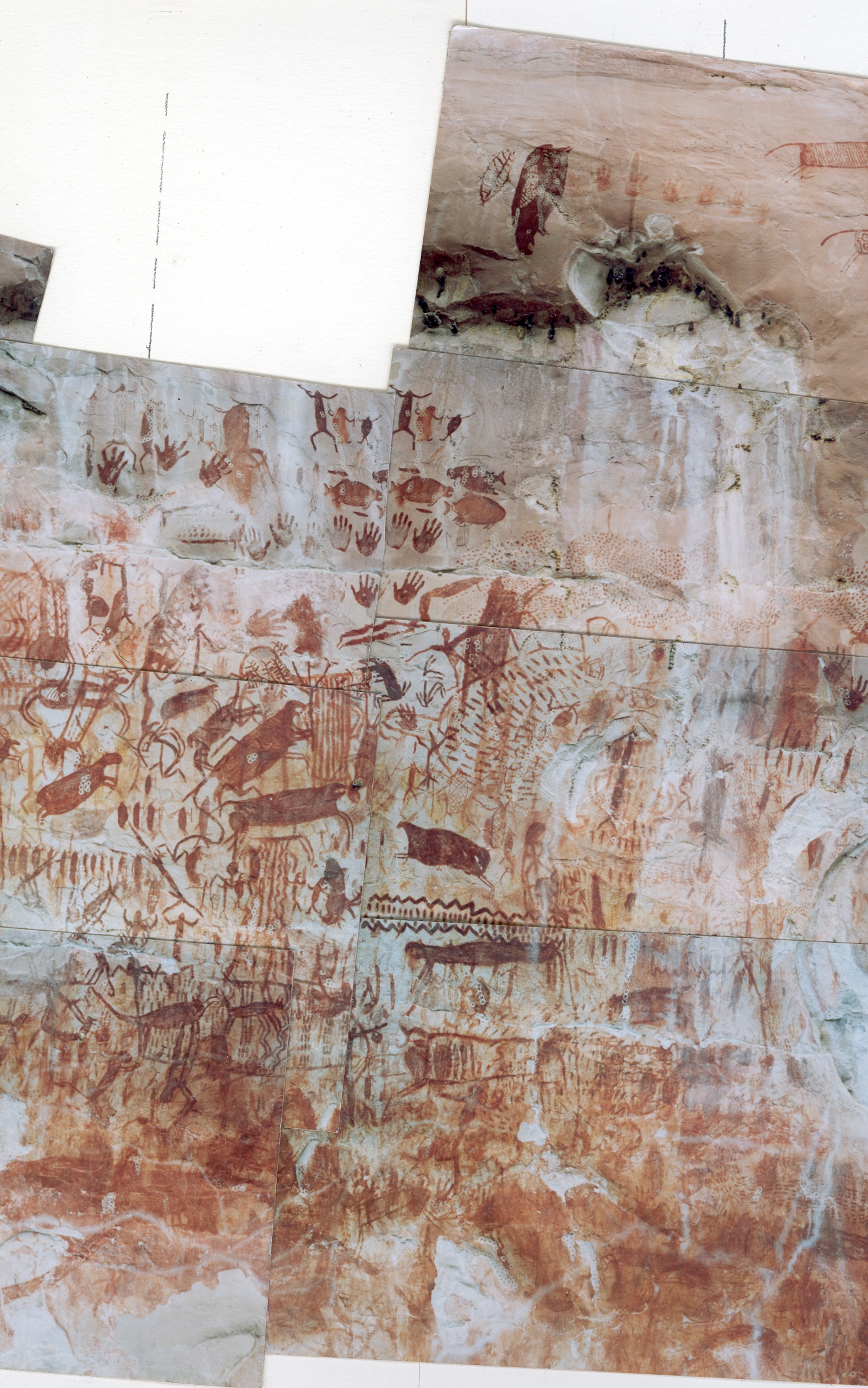
Pictographs

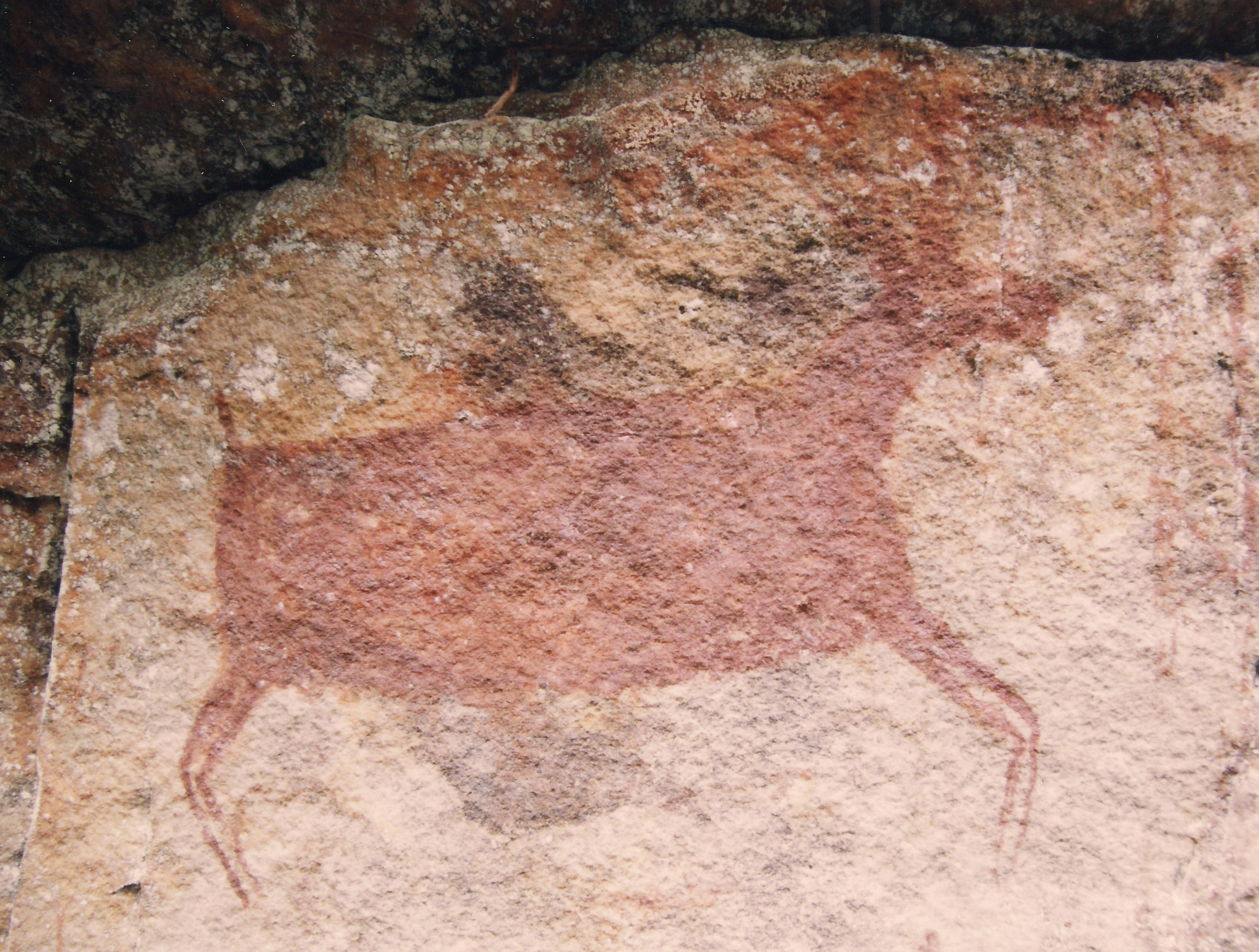
Pictograph, possible equine

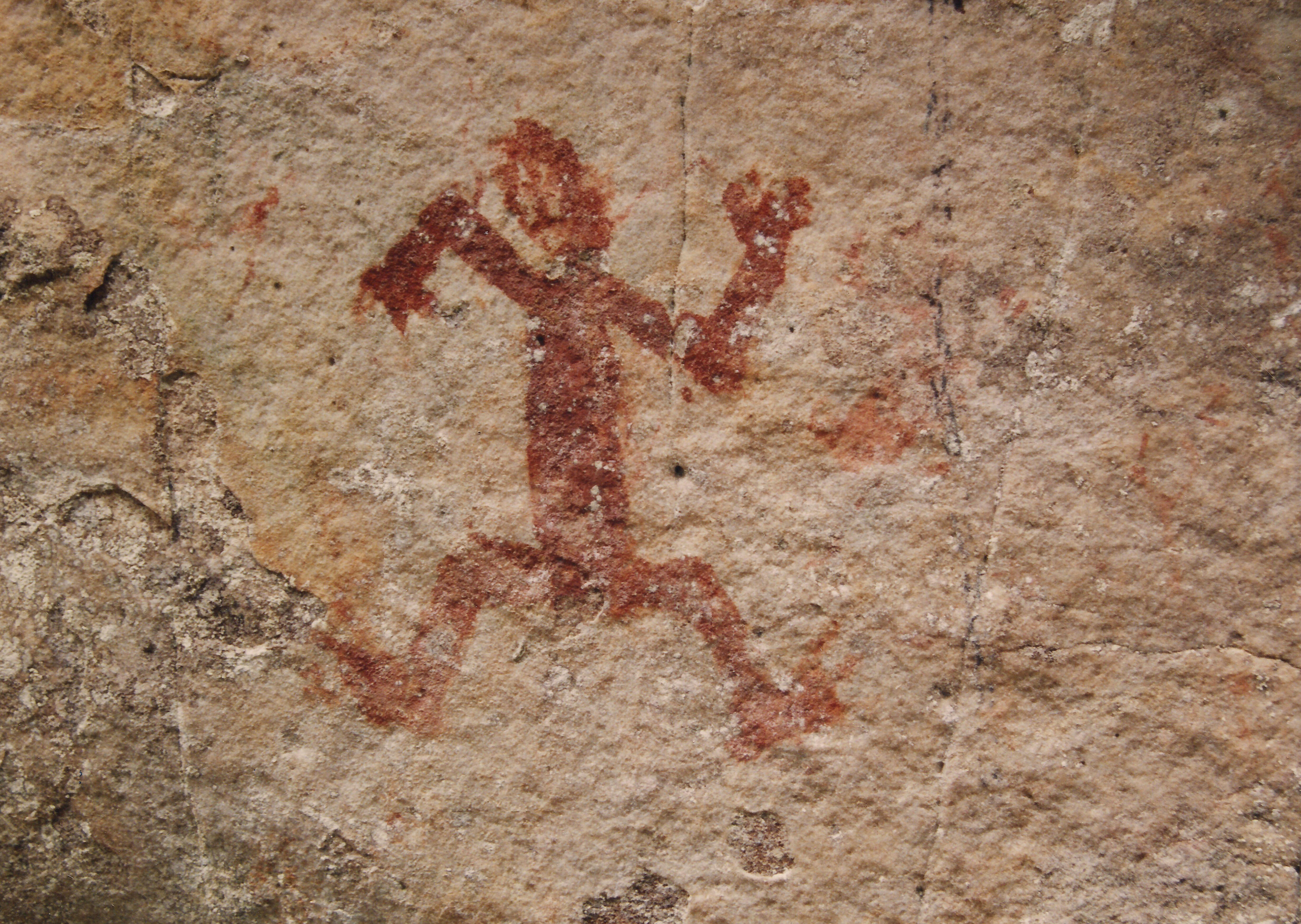
Pictograph, indigenous person

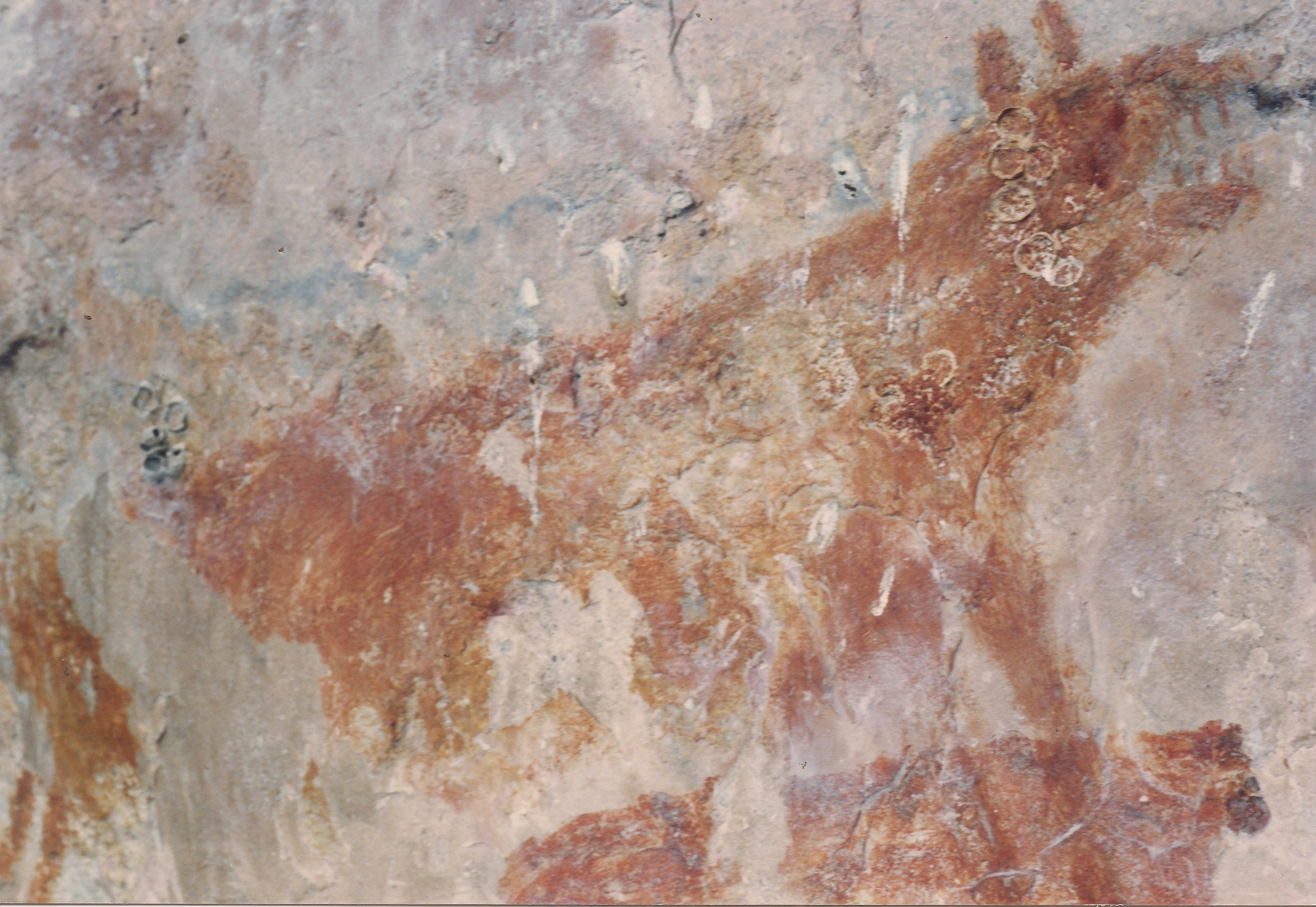
Pictograph, possible mammal
