= Caño Paujil =

- Location within Colombia
- Location: Araracuara, Caquetá, Colombia
- Coordinates: 0°34′05″S 72°26′26″W
- Elevation: 122 m (400 ft)
- Number of drops: 1
- Watercourse: Caquetá River

Caño Paujil is a waterfall in the Colombian department of Caquetá. It is located at an elevation of 122 metres (400 ft) in the Caquetá River, close to the municipalities Araracuara, Caquetá and Puerto Santander, Amazonas.

== Description ==
The waters of Caño Paujil originate from the Serranía de Chiribiquete. The climate around the waterfall is tropical, with average temperatures of 30 °C (86 °F). The fauna is Amazonian; jaguars, tapirs, anacondas, parrots and turtles. During the first half of the twentieth century, the area around Caño Paujil was important for the rubber production.

== Bibliography ==
- Wills, Fernando (2001), Nuestro patrimonio - 100 tesoros de Colombia - Our heritage - 100 treasures of Colombia (in Spanish), El Tiempo, pp. 1–311, ISBN 958-8089-16-6
