= A Neil Diamond Christmas =

Compilation album by Neil Diamond
- Released: October 28, 2022
- Recorded: 1992–2016
- Genre: Pop; traditional; Christmas

A Neil Diamond Christmas is a 2022 collection of Christmas songs recorded by Neil Diamond. It was released on October 28, 2022, in four physical configurations: a 180-gram black vinyl double album set; a limited-edition gold opaque 180-gram vinyl double album set; two CDs; and one CD.

Curated by Diamond and remastered by his longtime engineer, Bernie Becker, the tracks on A Neil Diamond Christmas were originally released between 1994 and 2016 on Diamond's albums The Christmas Album, The Christmas Album Volume II, A Cherry Cherry Christmas, and Acoustic Christmas.

== Track listing ==
=== Double album set ===
Side A
No.	Title	Length
1.	"Happy Christmas (War Is Over)"	3:23
2.	"The Christmas Song"	3:31
3.	"Jingle Bell Rock"	1:49
4.	"White Christmas"	3:55
5.	"You Make It Feel Like Christmas"	3:35
6.	"Morning Has Broken"	3:02

Side B
No.	Title	Length
1.	"Santa Claus Is Coming to Town"	3:25
2.	"Silver Bells"	3:04
3.	"Cherry Cherry Christmas"	3:26
4.	"Sleigh Ride"	2:36
5.	"Winter Wonderland"	2:39
6.	"Christmas Medley"	3:12

Side C
No.	Title	Length
1.	"O Holy Night"	3:27
2.	"Little Drummer Boy"	3:51
3.	"O Come, O Come Emmanuel / We Three Kings of Orient Are"	2:56
4.	"Silent Night"	4:00
5.	"O Come, All Ye Faithful (Adeste Fideles)"	4:12
6.	"Mary's Boy Child"	3:18

Side D
No.	Title	Length
1.	"Children Go Where I Send Thee"	5:26
2.	"The First Noel"	3:35
3.	"Hark the Herald Angels Sing"	4:12
4.	"Angels We Have Heard on High"	3:16
5.	"Christmas Prayers"	4:30
6.	"Joy to the World"	3:18

=== Double CD set ===
Disc 1
No.	Title	Length
1.	"Happy Christmas (War Is Over)"	4:04
2.	"The Christmas Song"	3:31
3.	"Jingle Bell Rock"	1:49
4.	"White Christmas"	3:55
5.	"You Make It Feel Like Christmas"	3:35
6.	"Morning Has Broken"	3:02
7.	"Santa Claus Is Coming to Town"	3:25
8.	"Silver Bells"	3:04
9.	"Cherry Cherry Christmas"	3:26
10.	"Sleigh Ride"	2:36
11.	"Winter Wonderland"	2:39
12.	"Christmas Medley"	3:12

Disc 2
No.	Title	Length
1.	"O Holy Night"	3:27
2.	"Little Drummer Boy"	3:51
3.	"O Come, O Come Emmanuel / We Three Kings of Orient Are"	2:56
4.	"Silent Night"	4:00
5.	"O Come, All Ye Faithful (Adeste Fideles)"	4:12
6.	"Mary's Boy Child"	3:18
7.	"Children Go Where I Send Thee"	5:26
8.	"The First Noel"	3:35
9.	"Hark the Herald Angels Sing"	4:12
10.	"God Rest Ye Merry Gentlemen"	1:17
11.	"Angels We Have Heard on High"	3:16
12.	"Christmas Prayers"	4:30
13.	"Joy to the World"	2:38

=== CD ===
No.	Title	Length
1.	"Happy Christmas (War Is Over)"	4:04
2.	"The Christmas Song"	3:31
3.	"Jingle Bell Rock"	1:49
4.	"White Christmas"	3:35
5.	"You Make It Feel Like Christmas"	3:35
6.	"Morning Has Broken"	3:02
7.	"Santa Claus Is Coming to Town"	3:25
8.	"Silver Bells"	3:04
9.	"Cherry Cherry Christmas"	3:26
10.	"Sleigh Ride"	2:36
11.	"Winter Wonderland"	2:39
12.	"Christmas Medley"	3:12
13.	"O Holy Night"	3:27
14.	"The Little Drummer Boy"	3:51
15.	"O Come, O Come Emmanuel / We Three Kings of Orient Are"	2:56
16.	"Silent Night"	4:00
17.	"The First Noel"	3:35
18.	"Christmas Prayer"	4:40
19.	"Joy to the World"	2:38

== Charts ==
Chart performance for A Neil Diamond Christmas
Chart (2022)	Peak position
Belgian Albums (Ultratop Flanders)	180
US Top Album Sales (Billboard)	46
US Top Holiday Albums (Billboard)	13
