= Oksana Grigorieva =

Russian musician (born 1970)

- Born: Oksana Petrovna Chernukha; 23 February 1970 (age 56); Saransk, Mordovian ASSR, Russian SFSR, Soviet Union (now Russia)
- Origin: Los Angeles, California, U.S.
- Genres: Pop; classical; traditional pop
- Occupations: Singer-songwriter; musician
- Instruments: Piano; vocals
- Label: Icon
- Spouses: Igor Baranov (m. 1989; div. 1989) Nicholas Rowland (m. 1992; div. 1994)
- Partner(s): Timothy Dalton (1995–2003); Mel Gibson (2007–2010)

Oksana Petrovna Grigorieva (Russian: Оксана Петровна Григорьева; born 23 February 1970) is a Russian singer-songwriter and pianist. She studied music in Moscow and completed conservatoire studies in Kazan, before moving to London. After studying music at the Royal Academy of Music, she moved to the United States, with periods spent living in New York City and Los Angeles, California. She taught music in the U.S., and patented a technique of teaching musical notation to children.

Grigorieva gained attention as a songwriter in 2006, after a song that she wrote, "Un día llegará", became popular on the Josh Groban album Awake. In 2009, Grigorieva's album Beautiful Heartache was released; the actor and director Mel Gibson, with whom she was romantically involved and had a child, served as executive producer. The following year, the couple had a widely publicized falling-out that eventually involved highly public legal proceedings and acrimony.

== Early life ==
Grigorieva was born Oksana Petrovna Chernukha in Saransk, Mordovian ASSR in 1970. Her parents were both music professors. She grew up in Ukraine and Russia, and at the age of 15 moved to Moscow to attend university to learn piano. She said of the experience learning music as a child, "Diplomas were everything. It wasn't unusual for students to play ten hours a day. Our skin would start to crack. We'd literally have bleeding fingers." Grigorieva finished conservatoire studies in Kazan.

She moved to London where she continued her studies and taught music to others. Grigorieva studied music at the Royal College of Music. While in London she worked as a model; having been spotted by photographer Patrick Anson, 5th Earl of Lichfield. Grigorieva noted, "In order to support myself I started to model. I did a lot of it, print, mostly. I've always looked after myself. I've never been dependent on anyone financially." In the U.K. she worked under the name Sacha Chernuha before changing it to Oksana Grigorieva. Grigorieva subsequently moved to the United States, and spent time living in New York City and Los Angeles, California. She taught music in the U.S., and patented a technique of teaching musical notation to children. Grigorieva composed and performed music, and produced works for theatre and advertisements.

== Music career ==
Grigorieva gained attention as a songwriter in 2006, after the song that she wrote, "Un día llegará" (Translated from Spanish: A Day Will Come), became popular on the Josh Groban album, Awake. Las Vegas Review-Journal highlighted "Un día llegará" in particular in a review of Groban's album Awake, commenting, "Groban's most effective tunes tend to be his most unadorned, when he favors understatement over ostentation, such as on the flickering piano ballad 'Lullaby' or the tremulous slow burn of 'Un día llegará,' with its touches of flamenco guitar." Prior to singing "Un día llegará" at a 2007 live performance, the song was "endorsed as a beauty" by Groban, in a statement to his fans. In a review of Awake, the Philippine Daily Inquirer called "Un día llegará" an "outstanding track". Fred Shuster of Los Angeles Daily News reviewed the album, and commented, "The gorgeous 'Un día llegará,' opening with a sweep of guitar, sets the mood for romantic highlights to come".

In 2009, Grigorieva's music album Beautiful Heartache was released; Mel Gibson supplementing her music career at the time by serving as executive producer. The album includes 11 tracks, and features a cover of the Russian song "Dark Eyes" and a collaboration with Charlie Midnight. Beautiful Heartache was marketed as "grown-up, piano-led pop, heavy on classical motifs". Save for the song "Say My Name", which was co-written with Gibson, Grigorieva wrote the entire album on her own. "Say My Name" was included in the 2010 film Edge of Darkness. ABC News reported that Beautiful Heartache garnered the singer "rave reviews" from music critics. Reuters commented of the album, "'Beautiful Heartache' features a collection of wistful love songs, blending shimmering string arrangements with pop and jazz-influenced arrangements that showcase Grigorieva's soulful voice." In a review of the album, Jack Foley of IndieLondon gave it a rating of 4 out of 5, and observed, "throughout, she displays a keen ear for melody, for honest emotional simplicity and classic values. She’s well worth taking the time to check out".

In December 2012 it was revealed Grigorieva was taking a detour into hip hop and dance music, scheduled for release in 2013.

== Personal life ==
Grigorieva was married in 1989 for three months to Russian lawyer Igor Baranov. In 1992, she married British artist Nicholas Rowland. She had a relationship with James Bond actor Timothy Dalton; Grigorieva met Dalton in 1995 while she was employed as a translator for filmmaker Nikita Mikhalkov. Dalton and Grigorieva had a son together (born August 1997) named Alexander. Their relationship ended in 2003.

Grigorieva has been involved in charity work with Chernobyl Children's Project International in Belarus.

=== Relationship and breakup with Mel Gibson ===
Starting in 2007, Grigorieva was romantically involved with actor Mel Gibson, and their daughter Lucia was born on 30 October 2009. The couple separated in April 2010. In June 2010, Grigorieva obtained a restraining order against Gibson, after stating he had physically assaulted her. Gibson was barred from coming near Grigorieva or their daughter. In July 2010, Gibson was identified as a possible suspect in a domestic violence investigation initiated after detectives spoke in Malibu to Grigorieva. Grigorieva and Gibson were involved in a child custody dispute involving their daughter in a confidential court case.

In 2010, Gibson offered a settlement worth approximately $15 million, but it was refused by Grigorieva. In May 2011, Grigorieva dropped claims of domestic abuse against Gibson. In August 2011, Grigorieva settled with Gibson and was awarded $750,000, joint legal custody, and a house in Sherman Oaks, California, to live in until their daughter Lucia turns 18, at which point the house will be sold and the proceeds turned into a trust fund for Lucia.

In 2013, Grigorieva sued her attorneys, accusing them of advising her to sign a bad agreement, including one with Gibson that states that if she took legal action against him, her previous settlement would be compromised.

In 2014, a judge ruled that Grigorieva had violated a confidentiality clause due to a conversation she had on the Howard Stern radio show where Gibson was mentioned; she lost half of her $750,000 award.

== Discography ==
- "Un día llegará", Josh Groban album, Awake (2006)
- Beautiful Heartache, executive produced by Mel Gibson (2009)
