= Aguada, Santander =

Coordinates: 6°15′N 73°28′W

Aguada
- Municipality and town
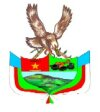
- Flag Coat of arms

- Location of the municipality and town of Aguada in the Santander Department of Colombia
- Country: Colombia
- Department: Santander Department
- Province: Vélez Province
- Founded: 1956

Government
  - Mayor: Ramiro Javier Ariza Almanzar (2016-2019)

Area
  - Municipality and town: 75.75 km^{2} (29.25 sq mi)
  - Urban: 0.04 km^{2} (0.015 sq mi)
- Elevation: 1,700 m (5,600 ft)

Population (2015)
  - Municipality and town: 1,855
  - Density: 24.49/km^{2} (63.42/sq mi)
  - Urban: 225
- Time zone: UTC-5 (Colombia Standard Time)
- Climate: Cfb
- Website: Official website

Aguada (Spanish pronunciation: [aˈɣwaða]) is a town and municipality in the Vélez Province of the Santander Department in northeastern Colombia. Aguada is located in the vicinity of the Opón River at an altitude of 1,700 metres (5,600 ft). It borders El Guacamayo in the north, San Benito in the south, Suaita in the east and La Paz in the west.

== History ==
The area of Aguada before the Spanish conquest was inhabited by the Yarigui people. In early 1537, the difficult expedition into the heart of Colombia led by Gonzalo Jiménez de Quesada passed through Aguada.

Modern Aguada was founded in 1956.

== Economy ==
Main source of income of Aguada is agriculture with products panela reed, maize, beans, yuca, coffee, peas and arracacha cultivated.
