= Women's suffrage =

Legal right of women to vote

Universal suffrage for women

Women's suffrage is the right of women to vote in elections. Historically, women rarely had the right to vote, even in ostensibly democratic systems of government. The 19th century saw many movements advocating "universal [male] suffrage", most notably in Europe and North America; following this, movements for women's suffrage became prominent, and between the late 19th century and the early 20th century, women's suffrage was accomplished in Australasia, then Europe, and then the Americas. By the middle of the 20th century, women's suffrage had been established as a norm of democratic governance. Extended political campaigns by women and their male supporters played a central role in changing public attitudes, altering norms, and achieving legislation or constitutional amendments for women's suffrage.

The first wave of women's suffrage took place in 1893–1930, covering English-speaking countries, Scandinavian states, and some other parts of Europe. The experience of the First World War has been characterized as an important factor in shifting public support for women's suffrage. The second wave, 1930–1970, covered nearly all Latin American countries, much of Sub-Saharan Africa and the remaining European states (France, Spain, Belgium).

Prior to 1893, there were instances where women could vote in some elections and at the subnational level. The first national granting of women's suffrage was in 1893 in the then self-governing British colony of New Zealand. National and international organizations formed to coordinate efforts towards women voting, especially the International Woman Suffrage Alliance (founded in 1904 in Berlin, Germany). Most major Western powers extended voting rights to women by the interwar period, including Canada (1917), Germany (1918), Austria, the Netherlands (1919), the United States (1920) and the United Kingdom (1928). Notable exceptions in Europe were France, where women could not vote until 1944, Greece (equal voting rights for women did not exist there until 1952, although, since 1930, literate women were able to vote in local elections), and Switzerland (where, since 1971, women could vote at the federal level, and between 1959 and 1990, women gained the right to vote at the local canton level).

In many countries, limited suffrage for women was granted before universal suffrage for men; for instance, literate women or property owners were granted suffrage before all men received it. The United Nations encouraged women's suffrage in the years following World War II, and the Convention on the Elimination of All Forms of Discrimination Against Women (1979) identifies it as a basic right with 189 countries currently being parties to this convention.

== History ==
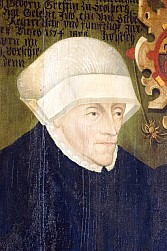
Anna II, Abbess of Quedlinburg. In the pre-modern era in some parts of Europe, abbesses were permitted to participate and vote in various European national assemblies by virtue of their rank within the Roman Catholic and Protestant churches.

=== Before the 19th century ===
In ancient Athens, often cited as the birthplace of democracy, only adult male citizens could vote. Women, slaves, and metics (resident foreigners) could not. Through subsequent centuries, Europe was ruled by monarchs, though various forms of parliament arose at different times. The high rank ascribed to abbesses within the Catholic Church permitted some women the right to sit and vote at national assemblies – as with various high-ranking abbesses in Medieval Germany, who were ranked among the independent princes of the empire. Their Protestant successors enjoyed the same privilege almost into modern times.

Marie Guyart, a French nun who worked with the First Nations people of Canada during the 17th century, wrote in 1654 regarding the suffrage practices of Iroquois women: "These female chieftains... have a deciding vote in the councils. They make decisions there like their male counterparts, and it is they who even delegated as first ambassadors to discuss peace." The Iroquois, like many First Nations in North America, had a matrilineal kinship system. Property and descent were passed through the female line. Women elders voted on hereditary male chiefs and could depose them.

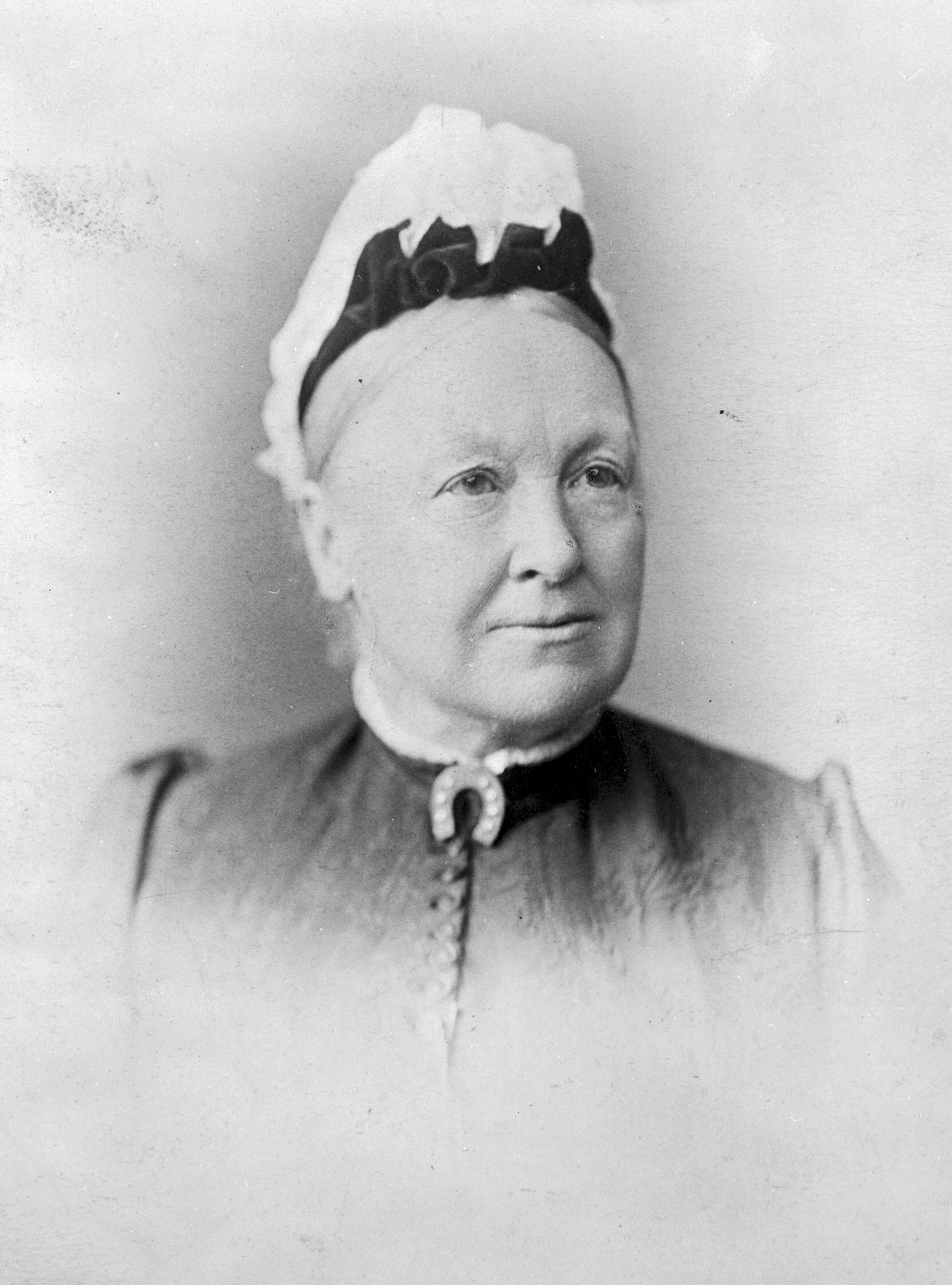
South Australian suffragist Catherine Helen Spence stood for office in 1897. In a first for the modern world, South Australia granted women the right to stand for Parliament in 1895.

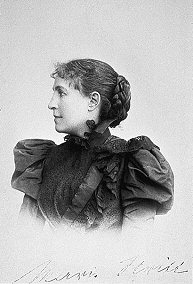
Marie Stritt (1855–1928), German suffragist, co-founder of the International Alliance of Women

The first independent country to introduce women's suffrage was arguably Sweden. In Sweden, conditional women's suffrage was in effect during the Age of Liberty (1718–1772).

In 1756, Lydia Taft became the first legal woman voter in colonial America. This occurred under British rule in the Massachusetts Colony. In a New England town meeting in Uxbridge, Massachusetts, she voted on at least three occasions.

Under the July 2, 1776 declaration of its independence from English rule, unmarried white women who owned property could vote in New Jersey and that remained unchanged until 1807.

In the 1792 elections in Sierra Leone, then a new British colony, all heads of household could vote and one-third were ethnic African women.

Before the 19th century, some countries granted women the right to vote partially or temporarily:

- in Sweden, between 1718 and 1771, major single or widowed women (married women are excluded), owners, subject to tax and members of guilds were authorized to participate in local and national elections. These rights were annulled in 1758 for local elections and in 1772 for national elections. The right to vote in municipal elections was again granted to major single women, taxable and owners between 1862 and 1919;
- the Republic of Corsica in 1755, and until its fall in 1769, implicitly granted the right to vote to single or widowed women (the electoral majority being set at 25 years);
- in France, under the Ancien Régime, women legally declared heads of family (widows, single women, or in cases of the husband's absence) had the right to vote in municipal assemblies until 1789. From 1302 until 1789, noble women who owned fiefs and mother abbesses were summoned to the Estates General to elect their representatives. In the elections to the Estates General of 1789, members of religious communities were admitted to vote, as well as, for the Third Estate, heads of agricultural or business operations, and in the cities, members of trade bodies and communities. Women were then explicitly excluded from the electorate starting from the elections to the Legislative Assembly of 1791 and until 1945.

Territorial entities, subnational, non-state or not recognized, also preceded many countries:

- the State of New Jersey (United States) from 1776 to 1807 under the condition, as for men, of being themselves owners;
- Lower Canada (British colonial province corresponding partially to current Quebec and Labrador), from 1791 and under the condition, as for men, of being themselves owners, restricted in 1834 and finally withdrawn after the Rebellions of 1837–1838, in 1849;
- the Pitcairn Islands (United Kingdom dependency) in 1838;
- the Mormon State of Deseret (1847) (became Utah in 1850);
- the province of Vélez (Colombia) from 1853 to its integration into the federal State of Santander in 1857;
- the territory of Wyoming (United States) in 1869 with right to eligibility. A few months later in 1870, a woman was elected justice of the peace in Laramie, the same year in the same city another is elected court bailiff (Court Bailiff);
- the territory of Utah (United States) in 1870. A federal Congressional act suppressed it in 1887;
- the Isle of Man (United Kingdom dependency) in 1881;
- the territory of Washington in 1883, suppressed by the Supreme Court of the United States in 1887;
- Wyoming as a state in 1890;
- Colorado (United States) in 1893;
- the Cook Islands (British protectorate) in 1893;
- South Australia (autonomous British colony) from 1895; became one of the first territories in the world to allow women to be candidates in legislative elections;
- Utah (admission to the Union) and Idaho (United States) in 1896.

Other early instances of women's suffrage included the Corsican Republic (1755), the Pitcairn Islands (1838), the Isle of Man (1881), and Franceville (1889–1890); but some of these operated only briefly as independent states, and others were not clearly independent.

South Australian suffragist Catherine Helen Spence stood for office in 1897. In a first for the modern world, South Australia granted women the right to stand for Parliament in 1895.

=== 19th century ===
The female descendants of the Bounty mutineers who lived on Pitcairn Islands could vote from 1838. This right was transferred after they resettled in 1856 to Norfolk Island (now an Australian external territory).

The emergence of modern democracy generally began with male citizens obtaining the right to vote in advance of female citizens, except in the Kingdom of Hawai'i, where universal suffrage was introduced in 1840 without mention of sex; however, a constitutional amendment in 1852 rescinded female voting and put property qualifications on male voting.

The seed for the first Woman's Rights Convention in the United States in Seneca Falls, New York, was planted in 1840, when Elizabeth Cady Stanton met Lucretia Mott at the World Anti-Slavery Convention in London. The conference refused to seat Mott and other women delegates from the U.S. because of their sex. In 1851, Stanton met temperance worker Susan B. Anthony, and shortly the two would be joined in the long struggle to secure the vote for women in the U.S. In 1868 Anthony encouraged working women from the printing and sewing trades in New York, who were excluded from men's trade unions, to form Working Women's Associations. As a delegate to the National Labor Congress in 1868, Anthony persuaded the committee on female labor to call for votes for women and equal pay for equal work. The men at the conference deleted the reference to the vote. In the US, women in the Wyoming Territory were permitted to both vote and stand for office in 1869. Subsequent American suffrage groups often disagreed on tactics, with the National American Woman Suffrage Association arguing for a state-by-state campaign and the National Woman's Party focusing on an amendment to the U.S. Constitution.

The 1840 constitution of the Kingdom of Hawaii established a House of Representatives, but did not specify who was eligible to participate in the election of it. Some academics have argued that this omission enabled women to vote in the first elections, in which votes were cast by means of signatures on petitions; but this interpretation remains controversial. The second constitution of 1852 specified that suffrage was restricted to males over twenty years-old.

In 1849, the Grand Duchy of Tuscany, in Italy, was the first European state to have a law that provided for the vote of women, for administrative elections, taking up a tradition that was already informally sometimes present in Italy.

The 1853 Constitution of the province of Vélez in the Republic of New Granada, modern day Colombia, allowed for married women, or women older than the age of 21, the right to vote within the province. However, this law was subsequently annulled by the Supreme Court of the Republic, arguing that the citizens of the province could not have more rights than those already guaranteed to the citizens of the other provinces of the country, thus eliminating female suffrage from this province in 1856.

In 1881, the Isle of Man, an internally self-governing dependent territory of the British Crown, enfranchised women property owners. With this it provided the first action for women's suffrage within the British Isles.

The Pacific commune of Franceville (now Port Vila, Vanuatu), maintained independence from 1889 to 1890, becoming the first self-governing nation to adopt universal suffrage without distinction of sex or color, although only white males were permitted to hold office.

For countries that have their origins in self-governing colonies but later became independent nations in the 20th century, the Colony of New Zealand was the first to acknowledge women's right to vote in 1893, largely due to a movement led by Kate Sheppard. The British protectorate of Cook Islands rendered the same right in 1893 as well. Another British colony, South Australia, followed in 1895, enacting laws which not only extended voting to women, but also made women eligible to stand for election to its parliament. (Note: South Australia celebrated the centenary of the female franchise in 1994; that is, 100 years from the date the legislation was passed by parliament rather that from the date it gained royal assent.)

=== 20th century ===
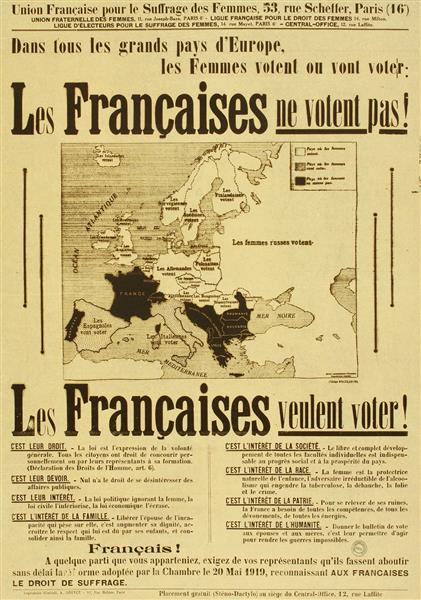
French pro-suffrage poster, 1934, whose message begins: "In all the great countries of Europe, women vote or want to vote; French women do not vote! French women want to vote!"

Following the federation of the British colonies in Australia in 1901, the new federal government enacted the Commonwealth Franchise Act 1902 which allowed female British subjects to vote and stand for election on the same terms as men. However, many indigenous Australians remained excluded from voting federally until 1962.

The first place in Europe to introduce women's suffrage was the Grand Duchy of Finland in 1906, and it also became the first place in continental Europe to implement racially-equal suffrage for women. As a result of the 1907 parliamentary elections, Finland's voters elected 19 women as the first female members of a representative parliament. This was one of many self-governing actions in the Russian autonomous province that led to conflict with the Russian governor of Finland, ultimately leading to the creation of the Finnish nation in 1917.

In the years before World War I, women in Norway also won the right to vote. During WWI, Denmark, Russia (under the Provisional Government), Germany, and Poland also recognized women's right to vote.

Canada gave right to vote to some women in 1917; women got the vote on the same basis as men in 1920, that is, men and women of certain races or status being excluded from voting until 1960, when universal adult suffrage was achieved.

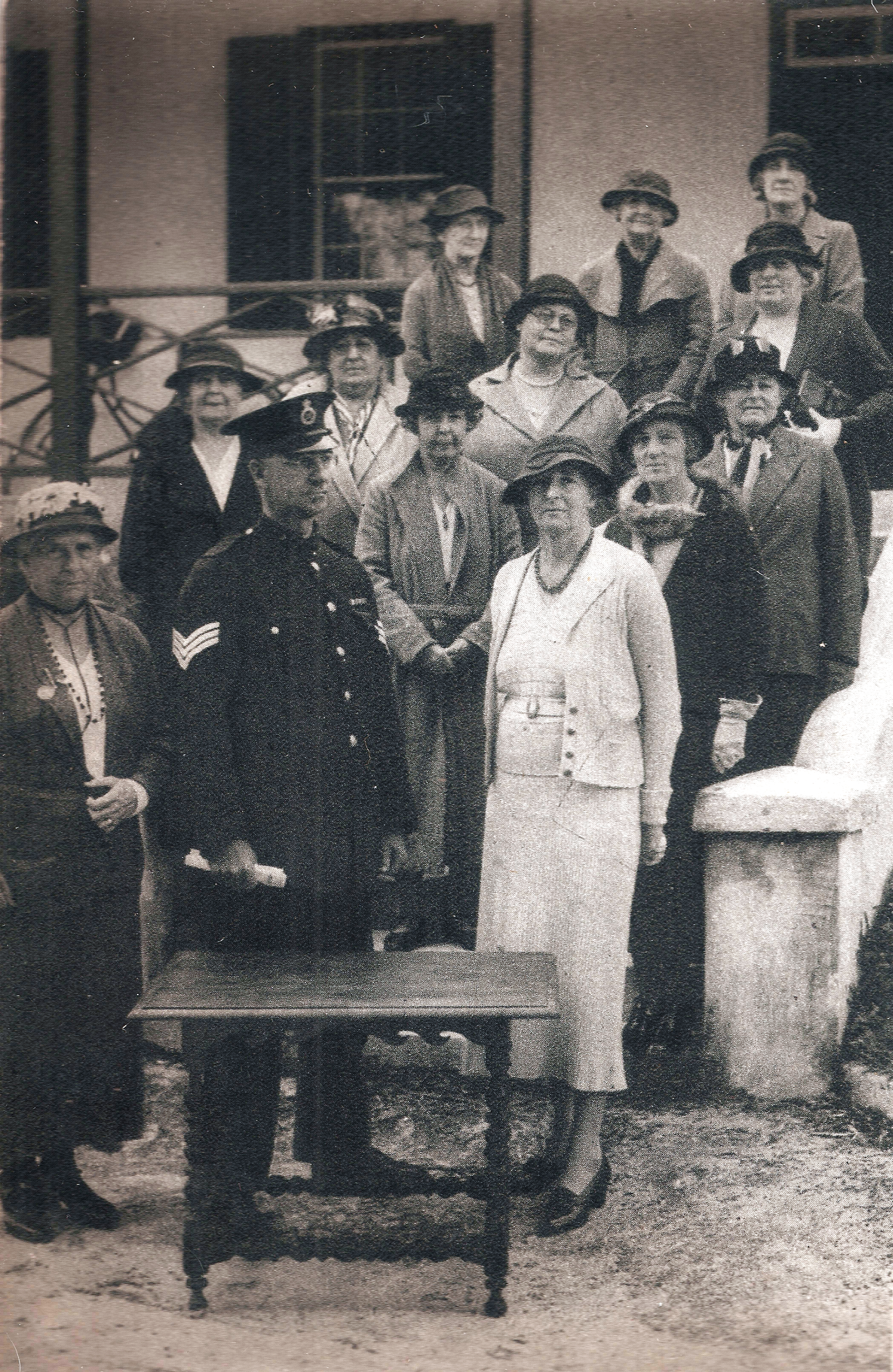
A Bermuda Police Sergeant confiscates women's suffrage activist Gladys Morrell's table in the 1930s.

The Representation of the People Act 1918 saw British women over 30 gain the vote. Dutch women won the passive vote (allowed to run for parliament) after a revision of the Dutch Constitution in 1917 and the active vote (electing representatives) in 1919, and American women on August 26, 1920, with the passage of the 19th Amendment (the Voting Rights Act of 1965 secured voting rights for racial minorities). Irish women won the same voting rights as men in the Irish Free State constitution, 1922. In 1928, British women won suffrage on the same terms as men, that is, for ages 21 and older. The suffrage of Turkish women was introduced in 1930 for local elections and in 1934 for national elections.

By the time French women were granted the suffrage in July 1944 by Charles de Gaulle's government in exile, by a vote of 51 for, 16 against, France had been for about a decade the only Western country that did not at least allow women's suffrage at municipal elections.

Voting rights for women were introduced into international law by the United Nations' Human Rights Commission, whose elected chair was Eleanor Roosevelt. In 1948 the United Nations adopted the Universal Declaration of Human Rights; Article 21 stated: "(1) Everyone has the right to take part in the government of his country, directly or through freely chosen representatives. (3) The will of the people shall be the basis of the authority of government; this will shall be expressed in periodic and genuine elections which shall be by universal and equal suffrage and shall be held by secret vote or by equivalent free voting procedures."

The United Nations General Assembly adopted the Convention on the Political Rights of Women, which went into force in 1954, enshrining the equal rights of women to vote, hold office, and access public services as set out by national laws.

=== 21st century ===
One of the most recent jurisdictions to acknowledge women's full right to vote was Bhutan in 2008 (its first national elections). Most recently, King Abdullah of Saudi Arabia, after both national and international condemnation and activism by feminist groups, granted Saudi women the vote and right to run for office for the first time in the 2015 local elections.

== Suffrage movements ==
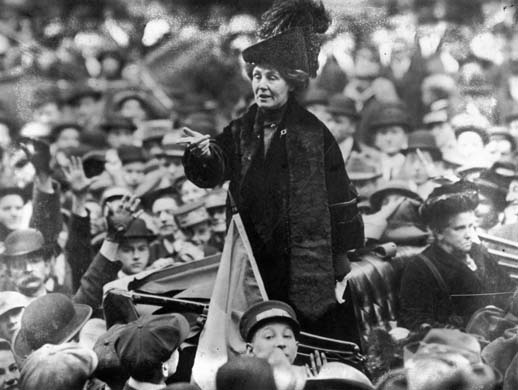
After selling her home, British activist Emmeline Pankhurst travelled constantly, giving speeches throughout Britain and the United States. One of her most famous speeches, Freedom or death, was delivered in Connecticut in 1913.

The suffrage movement was a broad one, made up of women and men with a wide range of views. In terms of diversity, the greatest achievement of the 20th-century woman suffrage movement was its extremely broad class base. One major division, especially in Britain, was between suffragists, who sought to create change constitutionally, and suffragettes, led by English political activist Emmeline Pankhurst, who in 1903 formed the more militant Women's Social and Political Union. Pankhurst would not be satisfied with anything but action on the question of women's enfranchisement, with "deeds, not words" the organization's motto.

Elizabeth Cady Stanton and Lucretia Mott were the first two women in America to organize the women's rights convention in July 1848. Susan B. Anthony later joined the movement and helped form the National Woman Suffrage Association (NWSA) in May 1869. Their goal was to change the 15th Amendment because it did not mention nor include women which is why the NWSA protested against it. Around the same time, there was also another group of women who supported the 15th amendment and they called themselves American Woman Suffrage Association (AWSA). The American Woman Suffrage Association was founded by Lucy Stone, Julia Ward Howe, and Thomas Wentworth Higginson, who were more focused on gaining access at a local level. The two groups united became one and called themselves the National American Woman Suffrage Association (NAWSA).

Throughout the world, the Women's Christian Temperance Union (WCTU), which was established in the United States in 1873, campaigned for women's suffrage, in addition to ameliorating the condition of prostitutes. Under the leadership of Frances Willard, "the WCTU became the largest women's organization of its day and is now the oldest continuing women's organization in the United States."

There was also a diversity of views on a "woman's place". Suffragist themes often included the notions that women were naturally kinder and more concerned about children and the elderly. As Kraditor shows, it was often assumed that women voters would have a civilizing effect on politics, opposing domestic violence, liquor, and emphasizing cleanliness and community. An opposing theme, Kraditor argues, held that women had the same moral standards. They should be equal in every way and that there was no such thing as a woman's "natural role".

For Black women in the United States, achieving suffrage was a way to counter the disfranchisement of the men of their race. Despite this discouragement, black suffragists continued to insist on their equal political rights. Starting in the 1890s, African American women began to assert their political rights aggressively from within their own clubs and suffrage societies. "If white American women, with all their natural and acquired advantages, need the ballot," argued Adella Hunt Logan of Tuskegee, Alabama, "how much more do black Americans, male and female, need the strong defense of a vote to help secure their right to life, liberty and the pursuit of happiness?"

== Explanations for suffrage extensions ==
Scholars have proposed different theories for variations in the timing of women's suffrage across countries. These explanations include the activism of social movements, cultural diffusion and normative change, the electoral calculations of political parties, and the occurrence of major wars. According to Adam Przeworski, women's suffrage tends to be extended in the aftermath of major wars.

== Impact ==
Scholars have linked women's suffrage to subsequent economic growth, the rise of the welfare state, and less international conflict.

== Timeline ==
Grant of female suffrage at national level
National elections suspended or otherwise not taking place.

Country	Year women first granted suffrage at national level	Notes
(Kingdom of Afghanistan) Afghanistan	1919	Elections were abolished in 1929
Albania	1945	Albanian women voted for the first time in the 1945 election.
Algeria	1962	In 1962, on its independence from France, Algeria granted equal voting rights to all men and women.
Andorra	1970	
Angola	1975	
Argentina	1947	On September 23, 1947, the Female Enrollment Act (number 13,010) was enacted in the government of Juan Perón
Armenia	1917 (by application of the Russian legislation); 1919 March (by adoption of its own legislation)	On June 21 and 23, 1919, first direct parliamentary elections were held in Armenia under universal suffrage – every person over the age of 20 had the right to vote regardless of gender, ethnicity or religious beliefs. The 80-seat legislature contained three women deputies: Katarine Zalyan-Manukyan, Perchuhi Partizpanyan-Barseghyan and Varvara Sahakyan.
Australia	1902 (Voting granted at Federal level except for "natives of Australia, Asia, Africa and the Pacific Islands (other than New Zealand)") 1962 (full)	Female vote won at the colony/state level: Colony of South Australia 1895, Colony of Western Australia 1899 (with racial restrictions), New South Wales 1902, Tasmania 1903, Queensland 1905 (with racial restrictions) and Victoria 1908. Indigenous Australians were not given the right to vote in all states until 1966.
Austria	1918	The Electoral Code was changed in December 1918. First election was in February 1919.
Azerbaijan	1918	Azerbaijan was the first Muslim-majority country to enfranchise women.
Bahamas	1960	
Bahrain	2002	No elections were held in Bahrain between 1973 and 2002.
Bangladesh	1971 (upon its independence)	
Barbados	1950	
British Leeward Islands (Today: Antigua and Barbuda, British Virgin Islands, Montserrat, Saint Kitts and Nevis, Anguilla)	1951	
British Windward Islands (Today: Grenada, St Lucia, St Vincent and the Grenadines, Dominica)	1951	
(Belarus) Belarusian People's Republic	1919	
Belgium	1919/1948	Was granted in the constitution in 1919, for communal voting. Suffrage for the provincial councils and the national parliament only came in 1948.
British Honduras (Today: Belize)	1954	
Dahomey (Today: Benin)	1956	
Bermuda	1944	
Bhutan	1953	
Bolivia	1938/1952	Limited women's suffrage in 1938 (only for literate women and those with a certain level of income). On equal terms with men since 1952.
Botswana	1965	
Brazil	1932	
Brunei	1959	National elections in Brunei currently suspended. Both men and women have voting rights only for local elections.
Kingdom of Bulgaria	1937/1944	Married women (and by default widowed women) gained the right to vote on January 18, 1937, in local elections, but could not run for office. Single women were excluded from voting. Full voting rights were bestowed by the communist regime in September 1944 and reaffirmed by an electoral law reform on June 15, 1945.
Upper Volta (Today: Burkina Faso)	1958	
Burma	1922	
Burundi	1961	
Kingdom of Cambodia	1955	
British Cameroons (Today: Cameroon)	1946	
Canada	1917–1919 for most of Canada; Prince Edward Island in 1922; Quebec in 1940; 1960 for Aboriginal People without requiring them to give up their status as before	To help win a mandate for conscription during World War I, the federal Conservative government of Robert Borden granted the vote in 1917 to war widows, women serving overseas, and the female relatives of men serving overseas. However, the same legislation, the Wartime Elections Act, disenfranchised those who became naturalized Canadian citizens after 1902. Women over 21 who were "not alien-born" and who met certain property qualifications were allowed to vote in federal elections in 1918. Women first won the vote provincially in Manitoba, Saskatchewan, and Alberta in 1916; British Columbia and Ontario in 1917; Nova Scotia in 1918; New Brunswick in 1919 (women could not run for New Brunswick provincial office until 1934); Prince Edward Island in 1922; and Quebec in 1940. Aboriginal men and women were not given the right to vote until 1960; previously, they could only vote if they gave up their treaty status. It was not until 1948, when Canada signed the UN's Universal Declaration of Human Rights, that it was forced to examine the issue of discrimination against Aboriginal people.
Cape Verde	1975 (upon its independence)	
Cayman Islands	1957	
Central African Republic	1986	
Chad	1958	
Chile	1949	From 1934 to 1949, women could vote in local elections at 25, while men could vote in all elections at 21. In both cases, literacy was required.
China	1949	In 1949, the People's Republic of China (PRC) incorporated equal rights for men and women into Constitution of the People's Republic of China (PRC), referring to the earlier Constitution of the Republic of China (ROC) in 1947. Elections in China (PRC) are not free nor fair, occurring under a one-party authoritarian political system controlled by the Chinese Communist Party (CCP).
Colombia	1954	
Comoros	1956	
Zaire (Today: Democratic Republic of the Congo)	1967	
Congo, Republic of the	1963	
Cook Islands	1893	
Costa Rica	1949	
Cuba	1934	
Cyprus	1960	
Czechoslovakia (Today: Czech Republic, Slovakia)	1920	The Czechoslovak Constitution adopted on 29 February 1920 guaranteed the universal vote for every citizen including women to every electable body.
Kingdom of Denmark (Including the Faroe Islands and, at that time, Iceland)	1908 at local elections, 1915 at national parliamentary elections	
Djibouti	1946	
Dominican Republic	1942	
East Timor	1976	
Ecuador	1929/1967	Despite that Ecuador granted women suffrage in 1929, which was earlier than most independent countries in Latin America (except for Uruguay, which granted women suffrage in 1917), differences between men's and women's suffrage in Ecuador were only removed in 1967 (before 1967 women's vote was optional, while that of men was compulsory; since 1967 it is compulsory for both sexes).
Egypt	1956	
El Salvador	1939/1950	Women obtained in 1939 suffrage with restrictions requiring literacy and a higher age. All restrictions were lifted in 1950 allowing women to vote, but women obtained the right to stand for elections only in 1961.
Equatorial Guinea	1963	Effectively a one-party state under the Democratic Party of Equatorial Guinea since 1987; elections in Equatorial Guinea are not considered to be free or fair.
Eritrea	No voting	There have not been elections in Eritrea since its independence in 1993.
Estonia	1917	Universal suffrage was declared by the Russian Provisional Government (in control of the then governorate of Estonia) on 15 March 1917 and applied in the elections of the Constituent Assembly. After becoming independent in 1918, Estonia continued its universal suffrage.
Eswatini (Formerly: Swaziland)	1968	While there are elections in Eswatini, the country is an absolute monarchy and the most recent general election had a very low turnout, causing some to call democracy in the country into question.
Ethiopia (Then including Eritrea)	1955	
Fiji	1963	
Grand Duchy of Finland	1906	Women retained the right to vote when Finland gained its independence from Russia in 1917.
France	1944	The law was enacted in 1944, but the first elections were in 1945.
Gabon	1956	
Gambia, The	1960	
(Georgia (country)) Democratic Republic of Georgia	1918	
Germany	1918	
Ghana	1954	
Greece	1930 (Local Elections, Literate Only), 1952 (Unconditional)	
Greenland	1948	
Guatemala	1945/1965	Women could vote from 1945, but only if literate. Restrictions on women's suffrage were lifted in 1965.
Guinea	1958	
Guinea-Bissau	1977	
Guyana	1953	
Haiti	1950	
Kingdom of Hawaii	1840–1852	Universal suffrage was established in 1840, which meant that women could vote. Opposition resulted in a specific denial of women's suffrage in the 1852 constitution.
Honduras	1955	
Hong Kong	1949	
Hungarian Republic	1919 (partial); 1945 (full)	After 1919 men could vote from the age of 24 while women only gained the right to vote from the age of 30. There were also educational and economical criteria set for both genders, but all criteria were higher for women. After 1945 both men and women gained universal suffrage from the age of 20.
(British Raj) India (Then under British colonial rule)	1921 (Bombay and Madras) 1929 (All provinces, including princely states)	
Indonesia	1937 (for Europeans only); 1945 (for all citizens, granted upon independence)	
Iran	1963	In 1945, during the one-year rule of the Azerbaijani Democratic Party, Iranian Azerbaijani women were allowed to vote and be elected.
Iraq	1980	
Ireland	1918 (partial); 1922 (full)	From 1918, with the rest of the United Kingdom, women could vote at 30 with property qualifications or in university constituencies, while men could vote at 21 with no qualification. From separation in 1922, the Irish Free State gave equal voting rights to men and women.
Isle of Man	1881	
Israel	1948	Women's suffrage was granted with the declaration of independence. But prior to that in the Jewish settlement in Palestine, suffrage was granted in 1920.
Italy	1925 (partial), 1945 (full)	Regarding local elections womens' suffrage was officially granted in 1925, but the local election themselves were abolished immediately after. Full suffrage was granted in 1945, first elections were organized the following year.
Ivory Coast	1952	
Jamaica	1944	
Japan	1945	
Jersey	1919	Restrictions on franchise applied to men and women until after Liberation in 1945.
Jordan	1974	Suffrage for educated women in 1955, extended to all women in 1974.
Kazakh SSR	1924	
Kenya	1963	
Kiribati	1967	
Korea, North	1946	
Korea, South	1948 (for both men & women)	Suffrage for both men and women were given at same date, same year right after the first constitutional law had been announced. Up to 1910, it was Korean Empire with despotic monarchy, so no one had the suffrage, and from 1910 to 1945, Korea was a colony of Japan, so again no one had suffrage for the Japanese Empire. From 1945 to 1948, South part of Korea was ruled by United States Army Military Government in Korea, so still no one had any suffrage for the government. From the first constitutional law of Korea, Korea adopted egalitarianism, giving the suffrage for both men and women at the same time.
Kuwait	2005	All voters must have been citizens of Kuwait for at least 20 years.
Kyrgyz SSR	1918	
Kingdom of Laos	1958	
Latvia	1917	
Lebanon	1952	In 1952, after a 30-year long battle for suffrage, the bill allowing Lebanese women to vote passed. In 1957, a requirement for women (but not men) to have elementary education before voting was dropped, as was voting being compulsory for men.
Lesotho	1965	
Liberia	1946	
Kingdom of Libya	1963 (1951 local)	
Liechtenstein	1984	
Lithuania	1918	
Luxembourg	1919	Women gained the vote on May 15, 1919, through amendment of Article 52 of Luxembourg's constitution.
Madagascar	1959	
Malawi	1961	
Federation of Malaya (Today: Malaysia)	1955	First general election for the Federal Legislative Council, two years before independence in 1957
Maldives	1932	
Mali	1956	
Malta	1947	
Marshall Islands	1979	
Mauritania	1961	
Mauritius	1956	
Mexico	1953	
Micronesia, Federated States of	1979	
Moldova	1929/1940	As part of the Kingdom of Romania, women who met certain qualifications were allowed to vote in local elections, starting in 1929. After the Constitution of 1938, voting rights were extended to women for general elections by the Electoral Law 1939. In 1940, after the formation of the Moldavian SSR, equal voting rights were granted to men and women.
Monaco	1962	
(Mongolia) Mongolian People's Republic	1924	
Morocco	1963	
People's Republic of Mozambique	1975	
Namibia	1989 (upon its independence)	At independence from South Africa.
Nauru	1968	
Nepal	1951 (upon gaining Democracy)	
Netherlands	1917	Women have been allowed to vote since 1919. Since 1917 women have been allowed to be voted into office.
Netherlands Antilles (Today: Aruba, Curaçao, Sint Maarten, Caribbean Netherlands)	1949	
Dominion of Newfoundland (Joined Canada in 1949)	1925	
New Zealand	1893	New Zealand was the first country to give women voting rights.
Nicaragua	1955	
Niger	1948	
Nigeria	1958	
Norway	1913	
Oman	2002	While, technically, elections take place in Oman, this is only to elect a consultative assembly with no power, as Oman is an absolute monarchy. Municipal suffrage introduced in Muscat in 1994, municipal suffrage in all Oman in 1996, and national suffrage in 2002.
Pakistan	1947 (upon its independence)	In 1947, on its creation at the partition of India, Pakistan granted full voting rights to men and women.
Palau	1979	
Palestine	1972	Women (and men) first voted in local elections in the West Bank in 1972. Women (and men) first elected a Palestinian parliament in 1996. However, the last general election was in 2006; there was supposed to be another in 2014 but elections have been delayed indefinitely.
Panama	1941/1946	Limited women's suffrage from 1941 (conditioned by level of education) equal women's suffrage from 1946.
Papua New Guinea	1964	
Paraguay	1961	
Peru	1955	
Philippines	1937	Filipino women voted in a 1937 plebiscite for their right to vote; women first voted in local elections later that year.
Pitcairn Islands	1838	
Poland	1918	Dekret o ordynacji wyborczej do Sejmu Ustawodawczego (Dz.U. 1918 nr 18 poz. 46)
Portugal	1911/1931/1976	With restrictions in 1911, later made illegal again until 1931 when it was reinstated with restrictions, restrictions other than age requirements lifted in 1976.
Puerto Rico	1929/1935	Limited suffrage was passed for women, restricted to those who were literate. In 1935 the legislature approved suffrage for all women.
Qatar	1997	While required by the constitution, general elections had been repeatedly delayed. Municipal elections have been held often.
Romania	1929/1939/1946	Starting in 1929, women who met certain qualifications were allowed to vote in local elections. After the Constitution from 1938, the voting rights were extended to women for general elections by the Electoral Law 1939. Women could vote on equal terms with men, but both men and women had restrictions, and in practice the restrictions affected women more than men. In 1946, full equal voting rights were granted to men and women.
(Russia) Russian Republic	1917	On July 20, 1917, under the Provisional Government.
Rwanda	1961	
Saudi Arabia	2015	In December 2015, women were first allowed to vote and run for office. However, there are no national elections in Saudi Arabia. The country is an absolute monarchy.
Samoa	1990	While elections in Samoa restrict candidacy to matai, there is universal suffrage.
San Marino	1959	
São Tomé and Príncipe	1975	
Senegal	1945	
Seychelles	1948	
Sierra Leone	1961	In the 1790s, while Sierra Leone was still a colony, women voted in the elections.
Singapore	1947	
Solomon Islands	1974	
Somalia	1956	
South Africa	1930 (European and Asian women); 1994 (all women)	Women of other races were enfranchised in 1994, at the same time as men of all races.
Spain	1924 /October 1, 1931 1977	Women briefly held the right to vote from 1924 to 1926, but an absence of elections meant they never had the opportunity to go to the polls until 1933, after earning the right to vote in the 1931 Constitution passed after the elections. The government fell after only two elections in which women could vote, and no one would vote again until after the death of Francisco Franco.
Sri Lanka (Formerly: Ceylon)	1931	
Sudan	1964	
Suriname	1948	
Sweden	1919	
Switzerland	1971 at federal level, between 1959 and 1990 at local canton level	Women obtained the right to vote in national elections in 1971. Women obtained the right to vote at local canton level between 1959 (Vaud and Neuchâtel in that year) and 1972, except for 1989 in Appenzell Ausserrhoden and 1990 in Appenzell Innerrhoden. See also Women's suffrage in Switzerland.
Syria	1949	
Grand Duchy of Tuscany	1848	
Taiwan	1947	In 1945, the island of Taiwan was returned from Japan to China. In 1947, women won the suffrage under the Constitution of the Republic of China. In 1949, the Government of the Republic of China (ROC) lost mainland China and moved to Taiwan.
Tajik SSR	1924	
Tanzania	1959	
Thailand	1932	
Togo	1945	
Tonga	1960	
Trinidad and Tobago	1925	Suffrage was granted for the first time in 1925 to either sex, to men over the age of 21 and women over the age of 30, as in the United Kingdom (the "Mother Country", since Trinidad and Tobago was still a colony at the time) In 1945, full suffrage was granted to women.
Tunisia	1957	
Turkey	1930 (for local elections), 1934 (for national elections)	
Turkmen SSR	1924	
Tuvalu	1967	
Uganda	1962	
Ukraine	1917 Ukrainian People's Republic, 1918 (West Ukrainian People's Republic), 1919 (Ukrainian SSR)	The Ukrainian People's Republic held аn election on 9 January 1918 [O.S. 27 December 1917].
United Arab Emirates	2006	Elections in the United Arab Emirates occur on a national level. However, their democratic usefulness is disputed.
United Kingdom	1918 (partial); 1928 (full)	From 1918 to 1928, women could vote at 30 with property qualifications or as graduates of UK universities, while men could vote at 21 with no qualification. From 1928 women had equal suffrage with men.
United States	1920 (nearly all); 1965 (legal protections)	Before the ratification of the Nineteenth Amendment in 1920, individual states had passed legislation that allowed women to vote in different types of elections; some only allowed women to vote in school or municipal elections, some required women to own property if they wanted to vote, and some territories extended full suffrage to women, only to take it away once they became states. Many states allowed women to hold a few office positions before gaining the right to vote. Although legally entitled to vote, black people (including black women) were effectively denied voting rights in numerous Southern states until 1965.
United States Virgin Islands	1936	Beginning in 1936 women could vote; however, this vote, as with men, was limited to those who could prove they had an income of $300 per year or more.
Uruguay	1917/1927/1932	Uruguay was the first country in all of the Americas – and one of the first in the world – to grant women fully equal civil rights and universal suffrage (in its Constitution of 1917), though this suffrage was first exercised in 1927, in the 1927 Cerro Chato referendum, and was put into national law through a decree in 1932. The first national election in which women voted was the 1938 Uruguayan general election.
Uzbek SSR	1938	
Vanuatu	1975	
Vatican City	No voting	The Pope, elected by the all-male College of Cardinals through a secret ballot, is the leader of the Catholic Church, and exercises ex officio supreme legislative, executive, and judicial power over the State of the Vatican City.
Venezuela	1946 (partial)	Though there are disputes as to the legitimacy of elections in Venezuela, they are ongoing at a national level.
Vietnam	1946	1946 North Vietnamese legislative election
North Yemen (Today: Yemen)	1970	
South Yemen (Today: Yemen)	1967	
Zambia	1962 (then Northern Rhodesia)	Women's suffrage granted in Northern Rhodesia in 1962.
Southern Rhodesia (Today: Zimbabwe)	1919 (whites only)	1978 (full)
Yugoslavia (Today: Serbia, Montenegro, Croatia, Slovenia, Bosnia and Herzegovina, Kosovo, North Macedonia)	1945	

== In religion ==
=== Catholicism ===
The Pope is elected by cardinals. Women are not appointed as cardinals, and therefore, women cannot vote for the Pope.

The female Catholic office of Abbess is elective, the choice being made by the secret votes of nuns belonging to the community. The high rank ascribed to abbesses within the Catholic Church formerly permitted some abbesses the right to sit and vote at national assemblies – as with various high-ranking abbesses in Medieval Germany, who were ranked among the independent princes of the empire. Their Protestant successors enjoyed the same privilege almost into modern times.

On 6 February 2021, Pope Francis appointed Nathalie Becquart an undersecretary of the Synod of Bishops, making her the first woman to have the right to vote in the Synod of Bishops.

On 26 April 2023, Pope Francis announced that women would be allowed to vote at the Sixteenth Ordinary General Assembly of the Synod of Bishops, marking the first time women were allowed to vote at any Synod of Bishops. Approximately 54 women voted.

=== Islam ===
In some countries, some mosques have constitutions prohibiting women from voting in board elections.

=== Judaism ===
In Conservative Judaism, Reform Judaism, and most Orthodox Jewish movements, women have the right to vote. Since the 1970s, more and more Modern Orthodox synagogues and religious organizations have been granting women the right to vote and to be elected to their governing bodies. In a few Ultra-Orthodox Jewish communities, women are denied the vote or the ability to be elected to positions of authority.

In the United States, Jewish women were hugely participatory in the suffrage movement. American Jewish support started in the mid-1800s but grew significantly at the turn of the twentieth century due to Jewish immigration from Europe. Jewish suffragists faced antisemitism and xenophobia from anti-suffragists and suffragists alike. By the time of the Nineteenth Amendment, a majority of American Jews supported suffrage.

Ernestine Rose was a Polish American suffragist who worked closely with Elizabeth Cady Stanton and Susan B. Anthony. She is sometimes referred to as "the first Jewish feminist" though she had renounced Judaism at an early age and was an active atheist.

== See also ==
- Anti-suffragism
- Art in the women's suffrage movement in the United States
- Gender Inequalities in France
- List of monuments and memorials to women's suffrage
- List of anti-suffragists
- List of suffragists and suffragettes
- List of the first female holders of political offices in Europe
- List of the first female members of parliament by country
- List of women's rights activists
- Open Christmas Letter
- Suffrage Hikes
- Woman Suffrage Procession of 1913
- Women's suffrage in the United States
- Women's suffrage movement in Washington
- Women's suffrage organizations
- Women's work
