= Aram Manukian =

Armenian revolutionary, first republic founder (1879–1919)

- Արամ Մանուկեան
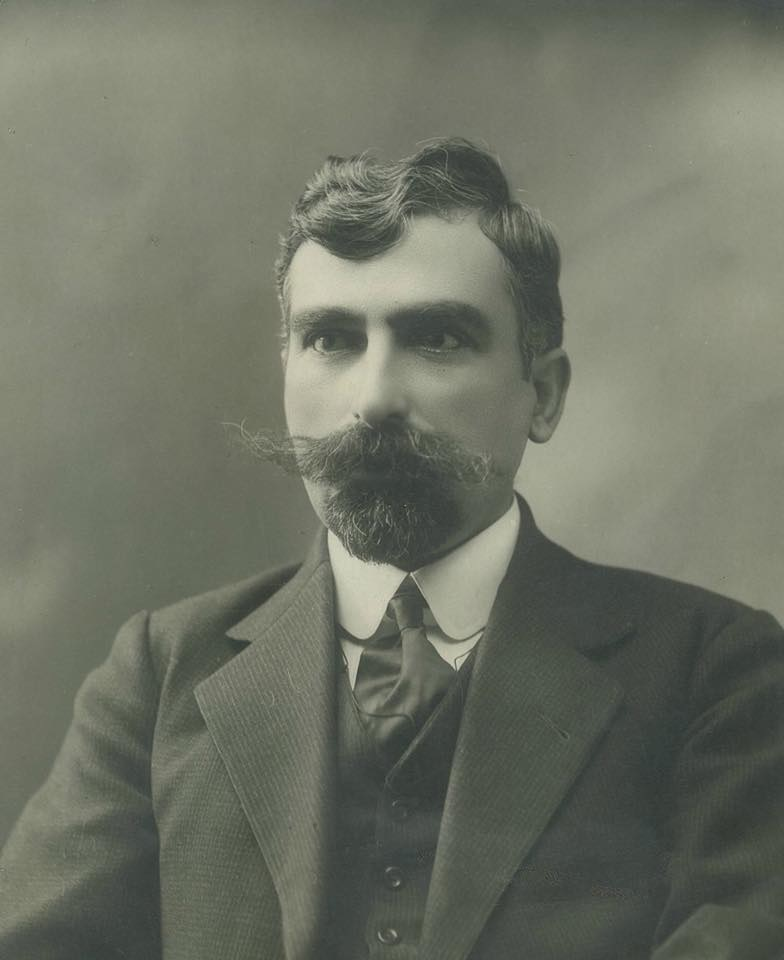

1st Minister of Internal Affairs of Armenia
- In office 30 June 1918 – 29 January 1919
- Prime Minister: Hovhannes Katchaznouni
- Preceded by: Position established
- Succeeded by: Alexander Khatisian

Head of the Civil Administration in Yerevan (Note: As the delegate of the Armenian National Council. "The Armenian provincial council was created in December at a conference sponsored by Bishop Khoren of Erevan. Yet the region lacked a strong and experienced leadership. In Tiflis, the Russian Armenian National Council delegated Aram Manukian to fill the gap.)
- In office 20 December 1917 – 30 June 1918

Provisional Governor of Van (Note: "The vali had clearly anticipated the 18 May arrival from the north of the Russian vanguard, with the volunteer battalion under Vartan’s command at its head. The next day, Major-General Nikolayev’s division arrived. To avoid a political vacuum, the Russian commander appointed Aram Manukian provisional governor of Van and authorized him to create a local administration. It functioned to the end of July.")
- In office 19/20 May – 31 July 1915

Personal details
- Born: Sargis Hovhannisian; 19 March 1879 Elisabethpol Governorate, Russian Empire
- Died: 29 January 1919 (aged 39) Yerevan, Republic of Armenia
- Party: Armenian Revolutionary Federation
- Spouse: Katarine Zalyan-Manukian
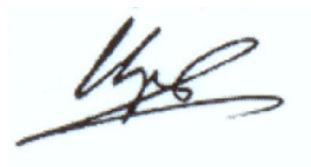
- Signature
- Nickname(s): "Aram pasha", "Aram of Van"

Aram Manukian (Note: His last name is alternately romanized as Manoukian, Manoogian, or Manukyan. In Armenian, his name is spelled Արամ Մանուկեան (reformed spelling: Արամ Մանուկյան). He is also referred to simply as Aram.) (19 March 1879 – 29 January 1919) was an Armenian revolutionary, statesman, and a leading member of the Armenian Revolutionary Federation (Dashnaktsutyun) party. He is widely regarded as the founder of the First Republic of Armenia.

Born and educated in Russian (Eastern) Armenia, he was mostly active in Van, one of the largest cities in Turkish (Western) Armenia. He rose to prominence there as a community organizer. During the first months of World War I, he worked with local Ottoman officials to de-escalate rising tensions until mid-April 1915, when Turkish forces laid siege to the city. He led the successful Armenian civilian self-defense of Van. As a result, tens of thousands avoided being deported and massacred by the Turkish government while the Armenian genocide was underway. (Note: "During World War I Aram Manukian (1879–1919) struggled a lot to keep the Armenians of Van from massacres. In the April of 1915 cooperating with other political forces he organized the self-defence of Van. Thanks to that and also with the help of Russian troops and Armenian volunteers, the Armenians of Van mainly were saved from slaughter.") He briefly served as the head of the provisional government in Van.

Following the Russian Revolution and the collapse of the Caucasian front in 1917–18, Aram was "popular dictator" of the unconquered area around the city of Yerevan. In May 1918, he helped organize the defense against the advancing Turkish army, which was effectively stopped at the Battle of Sardarabad, preventing the complete destruction of the Armenian nation. Manukian played an important role in the establishment of the First Republic of Armenia and served as its first minister of internal affairs. He died of typhus in January 1919, short of his 40th birthday.

Aram Manukian was an advocate for self-reliance. He was noted for his ability to unite different sections of society for a common cause. He is widely considered by scholars to be the founder of the First Republic of Armenia. During the Soviet period, he, along with other prominent Dashnaks, was largely disregarded. Since 1990, attempts have been made to revive his memory in independent Armenia.

== Early life ==
Aram Manukian was born Sargis Hovhannisian (Note: Spelled Սարգիս Յովհաննիսեան in classical and Սարգիս Հովհաննիսյան in reformed orthography. Some sources indicate Sergei/Sergey as his name, which is the Russified form of Sargis (also spelled Sarkis).) on 19 March 1879, either in Zeyva village in Zangezur (modern-day Davit Bek, in Armenia's Syunik Province) or in Shushi, the largest city of Karabakh at the time. His father, Harutyun, was a gunsmith; his mother, Sona, was a housewife. He was the youngest of five children. He received primary education at the Agulyats School in Shushi. Starting in 1895 he attended the city's diocesan school, where he joined the Armenian Revolutionary Federation, the main driving force of the Armenian national liberation movement. In the spring of 1901, Manukian was expelled from school for revolutionary activities and moved to Yerevan, where he continued his education at the local diocesan school. He graduated two years later, in May 1903. In 1903, Manukian went to Baku where he took part in strikes and later in the Armenian resistance against the confiscation of Armenian Church properties by the Russian government. He was briefly in Elisabethpol to organize the Armenian resistance there. In mid-1903 he moved to Kars, where he actively took part in the formation of armed groups. In September 1903, within a group of 150 men, Aram Manukian tried to cross the Russian-Turkish border to transfer weaponry to the fedayi in Sasun; however, he returned to Kars due to illness.

== Activities in Van ==
Manukian settled in the city of Van in February 1905. Because he spent most of his political career, except the last few years, in Van. Aram became associated with the city and came to be known as "Aram of Van", known in Armenian as “Vani Aram”. He soon became the head of the local party branch and sought to strengthen its influence in Van. Manukian was convinced that if Armenians were going to revolt against Ottoman rule, it needed to be a well-organized and widespread revolt and not a local one, such as the failed uprising in Sasun in 1904. He engaged in community organizing and transfer of weaponry (particularly rifles and bullets) to Van from Russia and Iran. In 1906 alone more weapons were transferred to Van than in the previous 15 years. Prior to the Young Turk Revolution, the party branch in Van had around a thousand members. He also sought to minimize the Ottoman government interference in internal Armenian matters. The ARF effectively established unofficial courts for Armenians, who were mistreated by the Turkish judiciary. In 1907, during the ARF Congress in Vienna, where he was the delegate from Van, Aram expressed skepticism about the declared goals of the Turkish emigre political movements in Europe that the ARF was cooperating with, particularly the Young Turks. He said that they are "for the most part, palace revolutionaries who in one sense or another have dynastic interests." Manukian claimed that if they "begin with them, we are going to encounter a great many problems." A year later the Young Turks ousted Sultan Abdul Hamid II from power and restored the constitution. Ottoman Armenians reacted positively to the overthrow of the sultan.

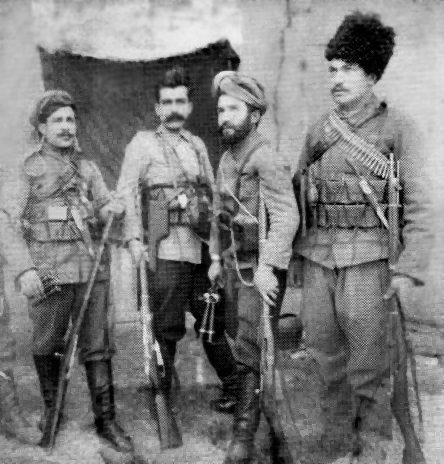
The ARF leaders in Van. From left to right: Harutyun, Aram Manukian, Ishkhan and Sogho

After the revolution, Manukian taught at a school in Ordu. He returned to Van in late 1912. Meanwhile, the Adana massacre of 1909 largely ended the Armenian hopes of reforms by the Young Turks. However, Manukian continued to work with local Ottoman officials and other Armenian parties, especially the Armenakan Party, to improve the condition of the Armenians. He became the leader of the ARF in the Van region along with Ishkhan and Arshak Vramian. He took an active role in the Armenian community by teaching at schools, communicating with the press and promoting Armenian youth circles.

In December 1912, Aram Manukian became a suspect in the murder of the mayor of Van, Bedros Kapamajian, an Armenian loyalist to the Ottoman government. He was arrested along with several other notable ARF members "as encouragers for the murder" according to Turkish sources. He was later released.

== World War I ==
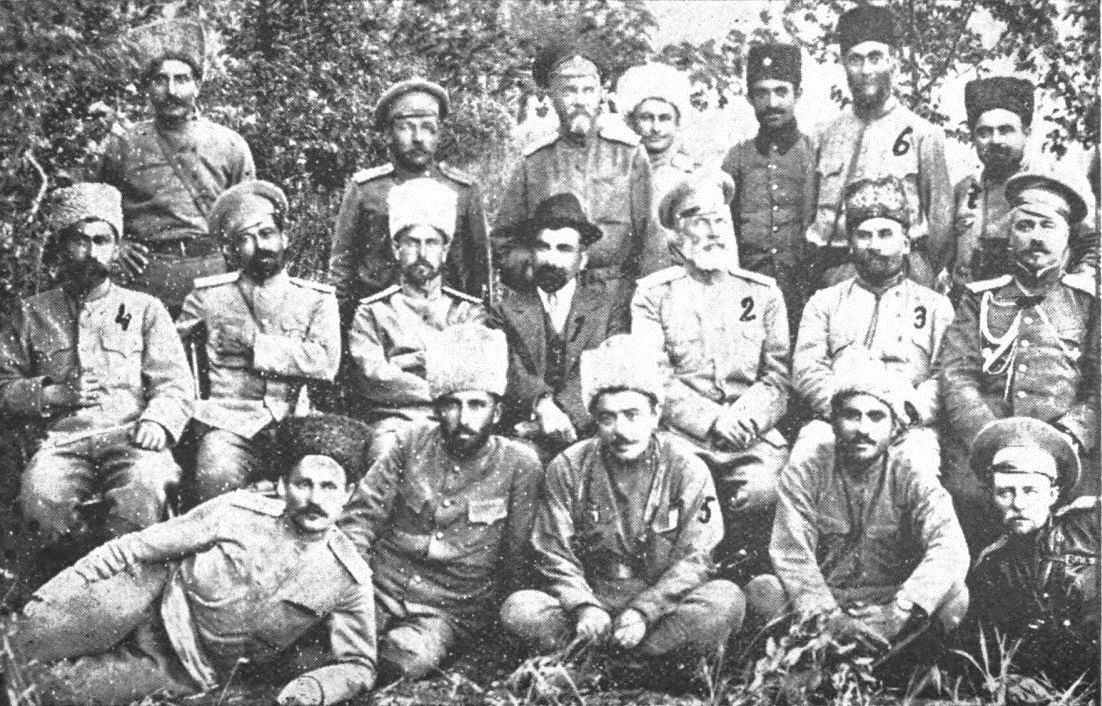
Aram (in center of the second row with black hat) along with other Armenian military commanders including Dro and Khetcho.

During World War I, the Young Turk (Committee of Union and Progress) government of the Ottoman Empire planned and carried out the Armenian genocide, the systematic extermination of the Armenians living in their ancestral lands. In the spring of 1915 Van became the only location where Armenians organized a major resistance. Aram Manukian played a key role in this resistance, widely seen as self-defence.

In late 1914, during the first months of the war, tensions in the Van Vilayet had been kept low by the cooperation of the Dashnak leaders Manukian, Ishkhan, Ottoman parliament deputy Arshak Vramian and local Young Turk officials and Van governor Tahsin Bey, who was considered a moderate. In early August, a general mobilization took place, during which some problems arose that were solved by the cooperation of these parties. An important event occurred in September, when Cevdet, the radical brother-in-law of Minister of War Enver Pasha, was appointed governor. According to Raymond Kévorkian, Cevdet's appointment "was probably calculated to make it easier to implement a policy of provocation." "Several more or less serious incidents occurred in the vilayet of Van between December 1914 and March 1915. Each time, the Armenian leaders had to step in to pour oil on troubled waters." In Van city, local prominent Armenians, such as Aram Manukian (Sergei Hovhannisian, 1879–1919), one of the principal Dashnakist leaders there, sought to calm the public—Armenian and Turk alike—through negotiations with the governor.

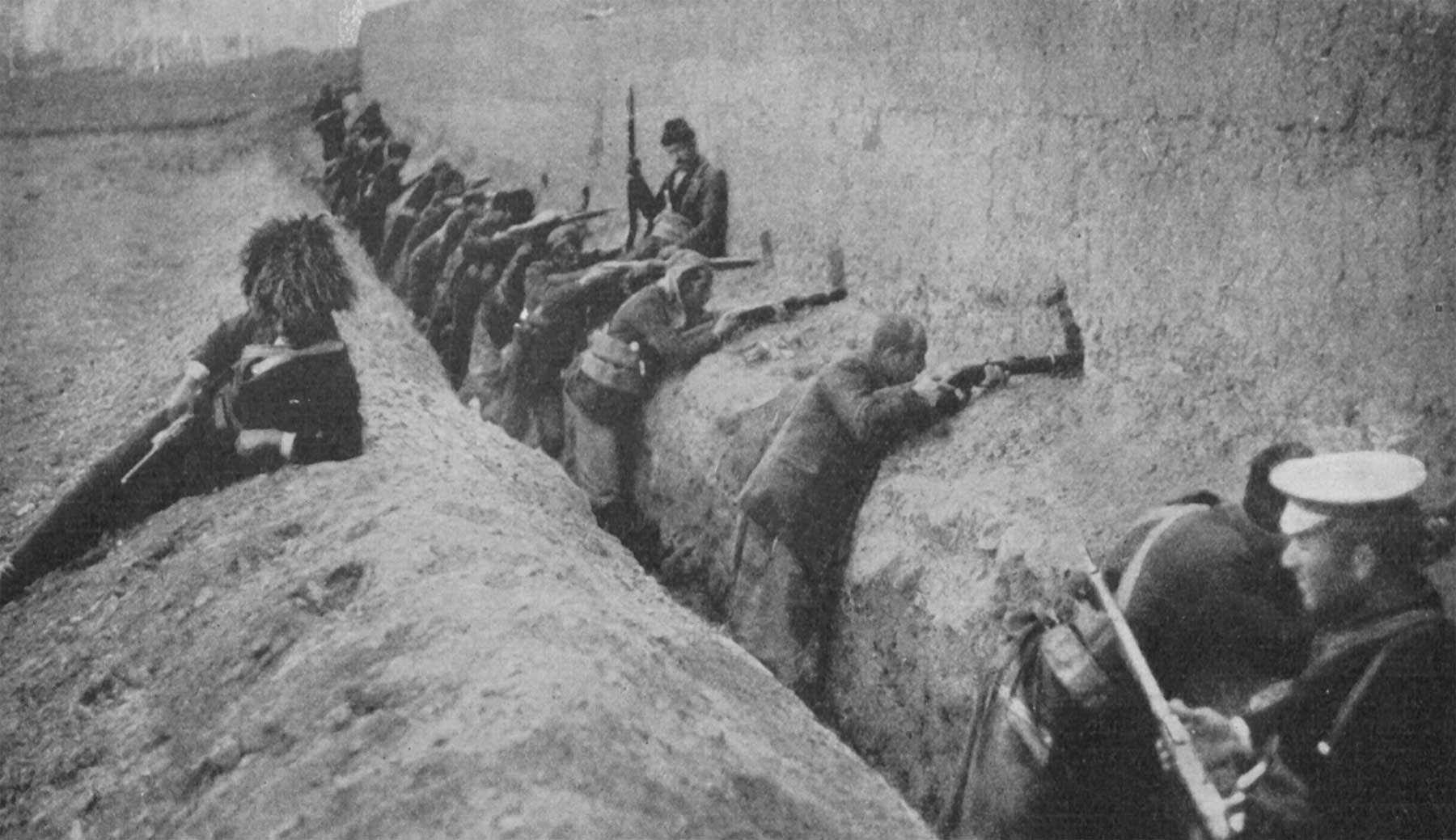
The Armenian defense in Van

Clashes between Armenians and Turks in the Van Vilayet became more frequent in March and April 1915. In late March and early April, Cevdet, Aram Manukian, Vramian and other major figures met to discuss the tensions. In mid-April, an incident took place in Shatakh. On the night of 16 April, Ishkhan, who was assigned a mediator's role, was killed by a group of Circassians while staying in a Kurdish friend's house in a nearby village. According to Kévorkian, "There is every reason to believe that none other than Cevdet, the superior of these Çerkez [Circassians], had ordered these killings. He had probably come to the conclusion that he could accomplish nothing in a city with an Armenian majority unless he first got rid of the three Dashnak leaders. His behavior the following day tends to confirm this suspicion." The next morning, Cevdet invited both Aram and Vramian to his konak. Aram did not go upon Vramian's advice. Vramian was subsequently murdered in a location near Bitlis. "The news shocked and dismayed the [Armenian] population. The American missionaries in Van, Dr. Clarence Ussher and Miss Grace Knapp, who were eyewitnesses to these events, provide us details that leave little doubt as to the vali's [Cevdet] intentions."

The greatest extent of the Russian occupation of Turkish Armenia during World War I, September 1917. The area was reoccupied by the Turks between February and April 1918.

On 18 April, Cevdet demanded all Armenians turn in their arms. Kévorkian suggests,

[Armenians] knew that they were doomed if they obeyed; yet, if they failed to, they would provide the vali with the pretext he needed to attack the city's Christian quarters and the rural areas. In other words, the Armenian leaders' strategy of temporization had become obsolete. The murder of Ishkhan on the night of 16 April and the arrest of Arshag Vramian – Van still did not know that he had been murdered – probably convinced the last Armenian leader left alive, Aram Manukian, to reject the authorities' injunctions and prepare the city for an attack that was now certain to come.

With Ishkhan and Vramian assassinated, Manukian remained only major Armenian leader in Van. Turkish forces attacked Aygestan, the old city of Van with a mixed Armenian-Turkish population, on 20 April. Aram "had already made preparations to ward off an attack and was able to prevent the Turkish troops from entering the quarter." In the following days, around 15,000 Armenian villagers poured into the old city quarter.

With the Russian-Armenian forces reaching Van, the Muslim population and Ottoman forces began to evacuate Van on 14 May, with the last troops leaving on 16 May after burning down their barracks. On 18 May, Armenian volunteers under Vardan entered Van, followed by Russian troops under Major-General Nikolayev. During this time, Nikolayev selected Manukian as the provisional governor of Van, allowing him to establish a provincial government. Manukian's administration lasted until the end of July. His first orders were to allow the looting and burning of houses belonging to Muslims to discourage their inhabitants from returning.

== Yerevan ==
We are alone and we must rely only on our own strength—both for the protection of the front and for the establishment of order in the country.

— Aram Manukian, March 1918

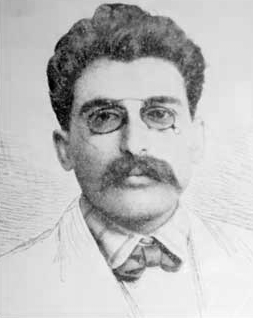
Manukian

=== Turkish offensive ===
Between October 21, 1917 and April 14, 1918 Manukian edited the newspaper Ashkhatank (Աշխատանք, "Labor") in Yerevan.

Following the February Revolution of 1917 the Armenian-populated areas formerly controlled by the Russian Empire had no effective political administration. In Yerevan, Bishop Khoren sponsored the establishment of a provincial council in December 1917. Aram was sent by the Tiflis-based Armenian National Council to head the civil administration of the city. Miller writes that the "choice was well calculated, for the hero of Van was a veteran organizer, fully aware of the strengths and shortcomings of his people." Aram arrived in Yerevan in early January 1918 and organized a committee which served as an unofficial administration. His committee established law and order in the city by expelling several Armenian bandit groups, imposing special taxes and confiscating materiel abandoned by the Russian troops.

In early 1918 Manukian and Dro established what historians describe as a "popular dictatorship" in the areas around Yerevan. Aram was popularly proclaimed "dictator of Yerevan" in March, thereafter consolidating all power in his hands. An effective military dictatorship was established in the last surviving pocket of unconquered Armenian-populated territories.

Turkish forces, in violation of the Armistice of Erzincan, moved towards Eastern Armenia in the spring of 1918. Aram's popular dictatorship is credited with successfully stopping the Turkish forces at the Battle of Sardarabad in late May 1918. A number of documents show that Aram headed the Armenian defense against the Turks. The battle is widely seen to have prevented the complete destruction of Armenians within their homeland.

=== Minister of internal affairs ===
On June 30, a five-member cabinet was formed by Hovhannes Katchaznouni in Tiflis with Manukian being appointed minister of internal affairs. On July 19 Aram, General Nazarbekian and Dro greeted the Katchaznouni-led cabinet arriving in Yerevan. According to Hovannisian, "even after the cabinet had begun to function in the capital, [there were] many who believed that Aram Manukian, the Minister of Interior, operated as a virtual dictator."

Hovannisian described the ministry as "strong, pervasive, effective, or contentious" under Aram. "The controversial and extra-legal activities of his department provoked the ire of parties both to the right and to the left of Dashnaktsutiun. Aram's impatience with the fetters of parliamentary government was evident, and, under the conditions then existing in Armenia, it was not difficult to find ample justification for strong centralized control or even a dictatorial regime." Ronald Grigor Suny wrote that Aram was supported by those who "insisted that the times required dictatorial rule", while "the champions of democracy in the legislature frequently criticized the highhanded methods of the interior ministry under Aram Manukian's direction."

Aram advocated for total disarmament of the Armenian population "as a necessary step toward establishing law and order. Others, however, contended that a people who had experienced turmoil and treachery for years would not comply with orders to surrender their arms, and insisted instead on allowing the armed population to contribute to the defense of the nation."

Between November 15 and December 13, 1918, Manukian acted as minister of labor after Minister Khatchatur Karchikian was killed.

== Death and funeral ==
With a large number of Armenian refugees settled in Yerevan, a typhus epidemic spread in the city during the winter of 1918–1919. Around two thousand orphans and refugees perished. Aram Manukian contracted the typhus in December 1918 when he was visiting the camps of refugees from the genocide. He died on 26 January 1919. He was living in extreme poverty and "refused to take medicine and gave it away to the poor, he wore old shoes and clothes." His death came as a shock and his funeral became a national day of mourning with thousands of Yerevan residents attending it. His biographer, Arshaluys Astvatzatrian, has left the following description of his burial:

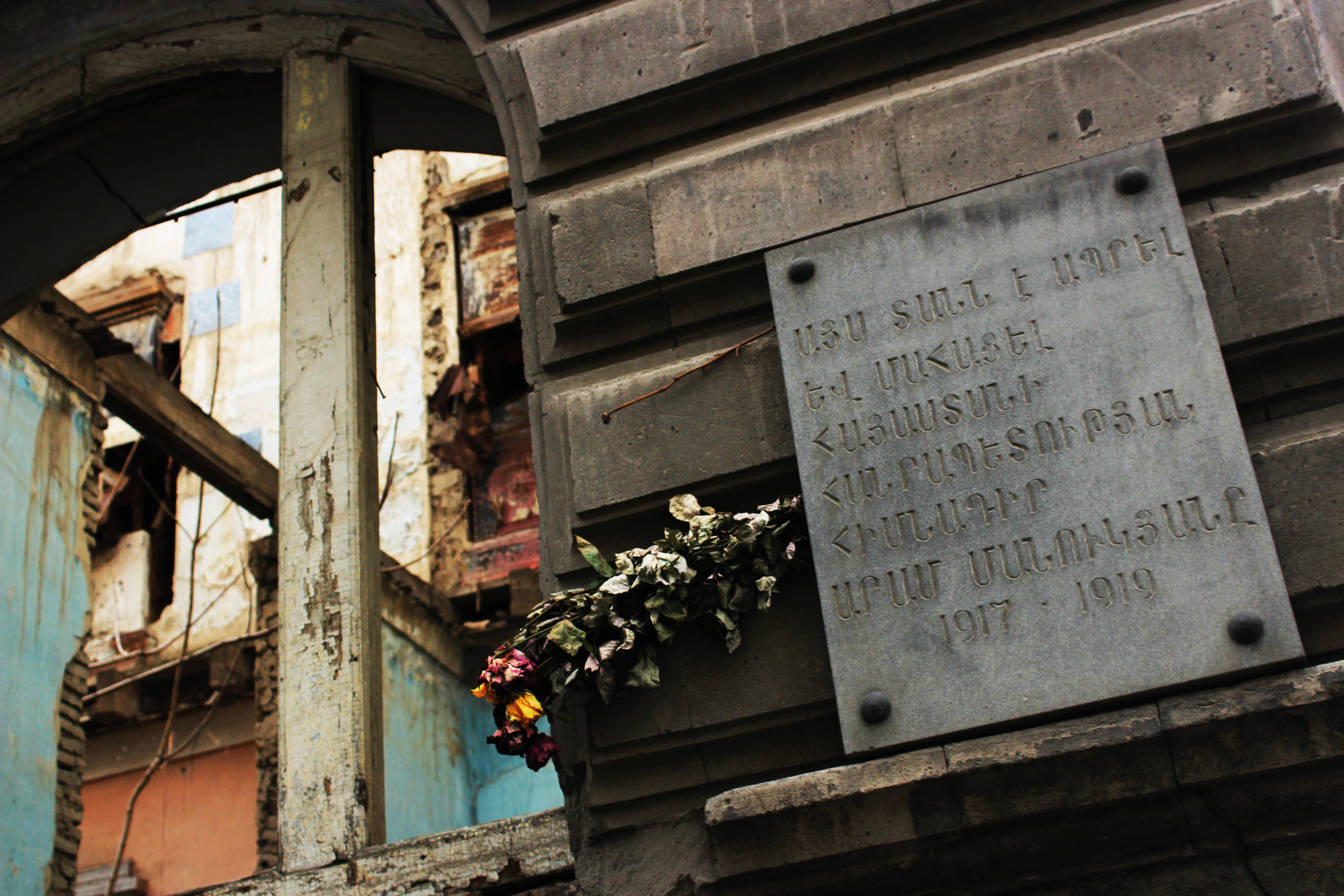
"The founder of the Republic of Armenia, Aram Manukian, lived and died in this house, 1917-1919."

The interment of Aram was an expression of great popular mourning. Thousands of people had come to give their final respect to the man to whom they had entrusted their fortune in the hardest days. I know what Aram was for Yerevan, but anyway, when we took out the coffin from his home, what I saw outside woke me up from the impact of the great loss and amazed me: wherever you looked, it was a human sea, in the street, on the roofs, windows, balconies, everything was occupied. The whole city, old and young, had come out to the street. From the church of Peter and Paul until the cemetery, the funeral carriage was empty: they were carrying the coffin on their shoulders and the carriers were mainly the Armenians from Van, who were particularly fond of Aram. [...] That day, the capital of Armenia was in mourning...

According to Richard Hovannisian the death of Aram—the "invincible leader"—"deepened the gloom" in Yerevan. Manukian was initially buried at the Mler cemetery (now Komitas Pantheon). In the 1930s, during the large-scale reconstructions in Yerevan (including the destruction of religious and historic buildings), his remains were moved to Kozern cemetery, which was soon turned into a park, and was eventually reburied at the Yerevan City Cemetery (popularly known as Tokhmakh).

In 1979 a group of Armenian patriots found Aram's tombstone and in August 1982 put a khachkar made by Garnik Amirjanyan on it.

== Personal life ==
Manukian married Katarine Zalyan in Yerevan in 1917. They met at an orphanage, where she worked as a doctor. Their only daughter, Seda, was born in 1918. Katarine was one of three women elected to the Armenian parliament in 1919. Upon Aram's death and Armenia's takeover by Bolsheviks, she found herself an unemployed single mother. She settled in Krasnodar, Russia, but returned to Soviet Armenia in 1927 to fill the shortage of doctors. She died in 1965. Their daughter, Seda, lived in Yerevan until 1976 when she moved to Moscow. She was married to the son of the prominent fedayi Khansori Vardan. She died in 2005.

== Legacy and public image ==
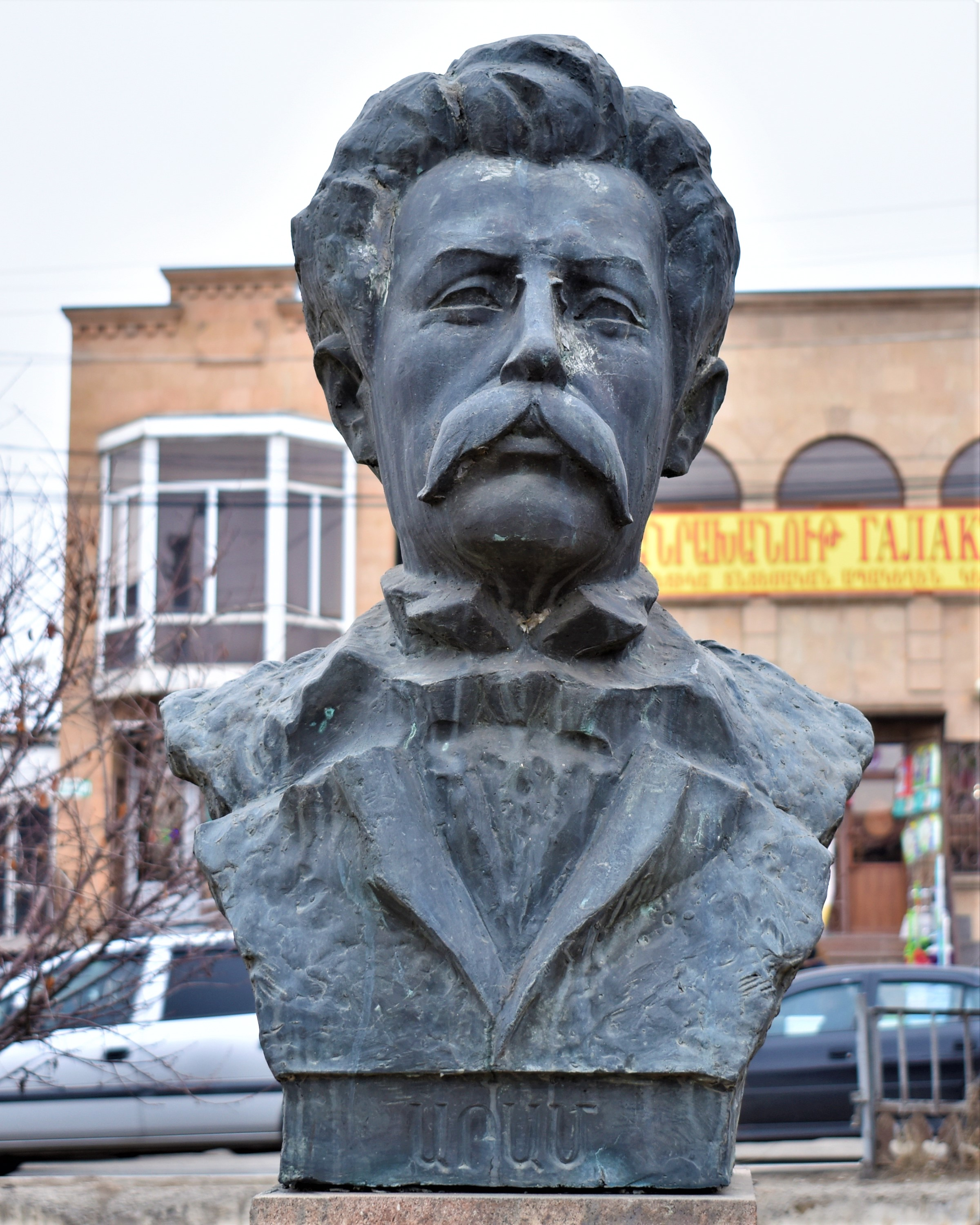
A bust of Aram in Gyumri.

During his funeral Minister of Culture and Education Nikol Aghbalian stated: "Ask yourselves if you have worked for the Armenian people as much as Aram, ask yourselves if you have been as selfless as Aram and have you given your life to the Armenian people as much as Aram." Simon Vratsian, the First Republic's last Prime Minister, said of Aram that he "never betrayed the people, remained within the people and made superhuman efforts in easing their pain."

As a result of the 70-year-long anti-Dashnak propaganda in Soviet Armenia, Aram Manukian and other key ARF members who played major roles in modern Armenian history were largely discredited and forgotten. While some of the heroes of Sardarapat were allowed to be talked about beginning with the 1960s, any publication on Aram was strictly restricted.

=== Historical assessment ===
Aram Manukian is now almost universally considered the founder of the First Republic, including by historians Richard G. Hovannisian, (Note: "Aram pasha, as he was known to friend and foe alike, had been a veritable founder of the Armenian republic.") Gerard Libaridian, Armen Asryan, Amatuni Virabyan, and Levon Shirinyan. Historian Harutyun Turshian described him as "one of the few realist figures in Armenia's entire history" and opined that "a distance in time is necessary to see his greatness and correctly evaluate him."

In a letter to his wife, the first prime minister of Armenia, Hovhannes Kajaznuni was more critical. Although he described Manukian as a "strong, energetic, active, and influential person among the masses", however, he "lacks understanding of the state, a broad view", and a "sense of legitimacy".

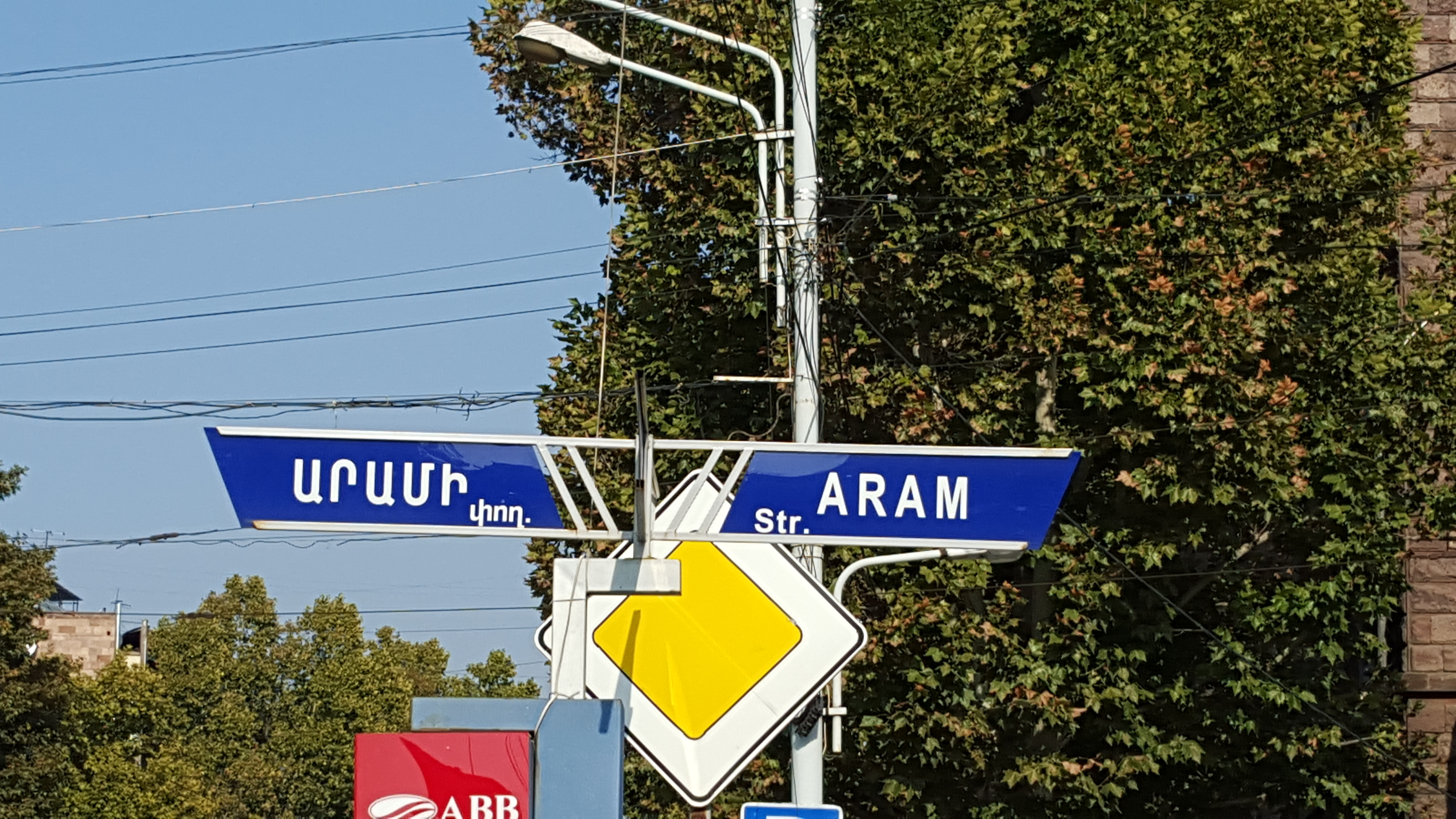
Aram Street sign n Yerevan

=== Revival in interest ===
Efforts were made by politicians to revive Aram's memory after Armenia achieved independence from the Soviet Union. To symbolize the revival of Armenian statehood, the initial declaration of the independence of Armenia from the Soviet Union on 23 August 1990 was read by Aram Manukyan, a member of the parliament who was chosen only because he bore the same name as the founder of the First Republic. However, in 2009 an ARF member of parliament noted that he was not widely known to the Armenian public.

Scholar-turned-political activist Rafael Ishkhanyan highly praised Aram Manukian in his 1989 essay "The Law of Excluding the Third Force", written at a time of the Soviet Union's disintegration and the national awakening associated with the Karabakh movement. Aram, in Ishkhanyan's words, is the prime example of an individual who ruled out any reliance on foreign powers and founded a new Armenian state without foreign support. His son, Avetik Ishkhanyan, a human rights activist, also highly praised Aram Manukian as the "greatest and most powerful politician of modern Armenian history." Avetik Ishkhanyan also opined that Aram belongs to the Armenian people and not just the ARF.

Modern leading ARF politician Vahan Hovhannisyan stated in 2008 that Aram Manukian is the best example in Armenian history of a statesman that "stood by the people."

== Tributes ==
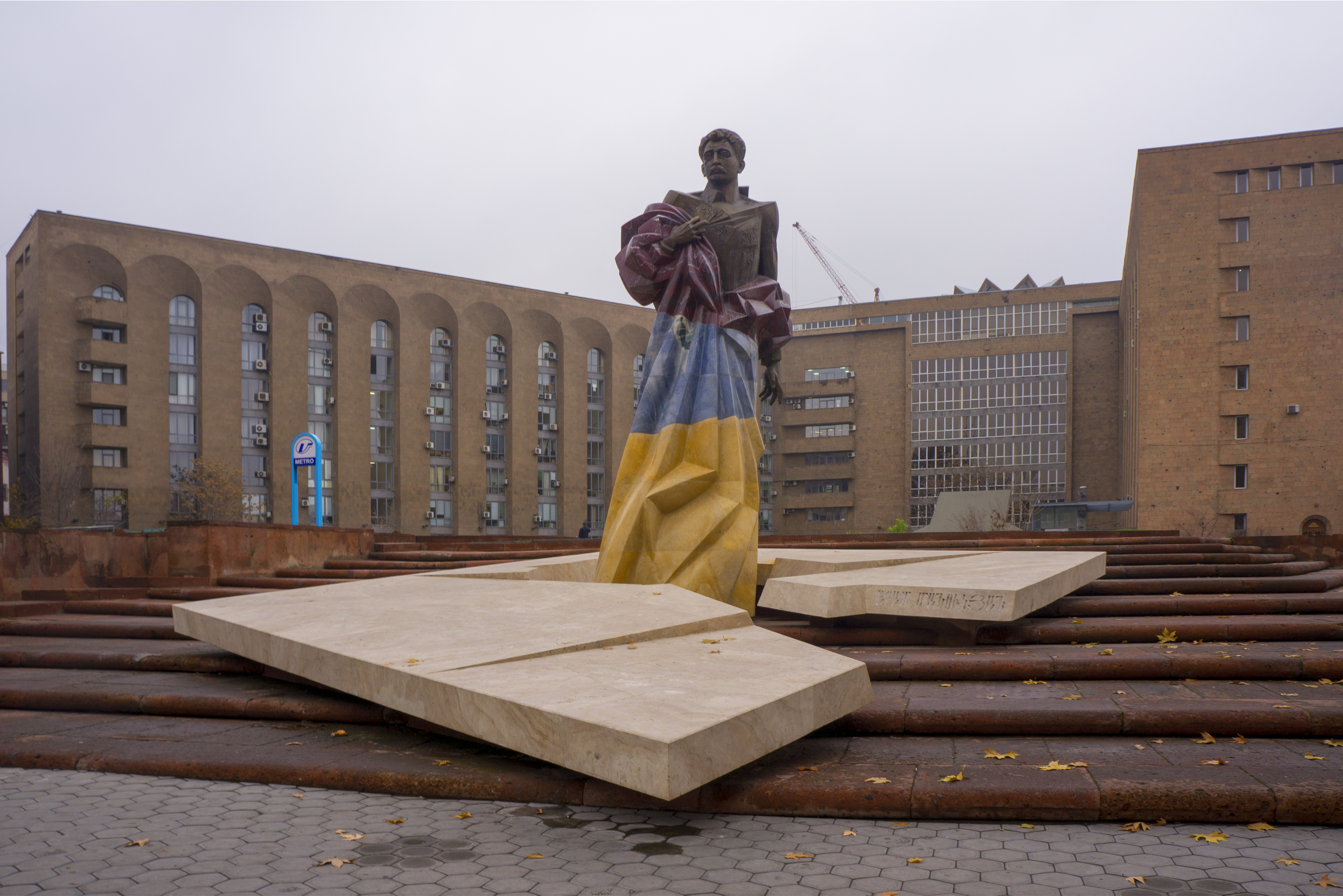
Manukian's statue in central Yerevan erected in July 2018

On July 17, 2018 Aram Manukian's statue was officially unveiled near the Republic Square metro station in attendance of ARF leader Hrant Markarian, Prime Minister Nikol Pashinyan, President Armen Sarkissian and Catholicos Karekin II. In his speech, Pashinyan called Aram the "greatest apostle of our modern history." The choice of the statue and location were criticized and both the Ministry of Culture and the Urban Development Committee declared their reservations.

Aram Manukian's bust was unveiled before the Armenian police headquarters in 2009 due to the fact that he was Armenia's first Interior Minister, which includes the police department. The ARF-affiliated Yerkir Media criticized the Armenian government, saying: "Find another nation, which pays tribute to the founder of their statehood by a bust, yet alone before the police headquarters, just because Aram Manukian was the Minister of Internal Affairs of the First Republic." Historian Tigran Petrosyants suggested that the Yerevan Municipality erect a statue of Aram in the city.

In Kapan, a neighborhood is named after him. In 2009 Aram's bust was unveiled in the city.

In 2017 an educational center in Nubarashen, Yerevan specializing in athletic and military training was founded and named after Aram Manukian.

In May 2018, on the occasion of the centennial of the First Republic of Armenia the busts of Aram Manukian and Nikol Aghbalian were unveiled at the Sardarapat Ethnography and Liberation Movement History Museum, adjacent to the Sardarapat Memorial near Armavir, Armenia. A year later, a monument dedicated to the 140th anniversary of Manukian's birth was unveiled at Sardarapat, where one part of his remains were interred.

A medal of the Armenian Police named after Manukian is "awarded to a Police employee for significant contribution to the Police system operations development, strengthening law and order, combatting crime, maintenance of public order and security protection, staff education."

In 1989 a volunteer regiment Aram Manukian was founded in the city of Ararat, which took part in the First Nagorno-Karabakh War.

The Canadian branch of the Armenian Youth Federation named its Cambridge, Ontario chapter after Aram Manukian.

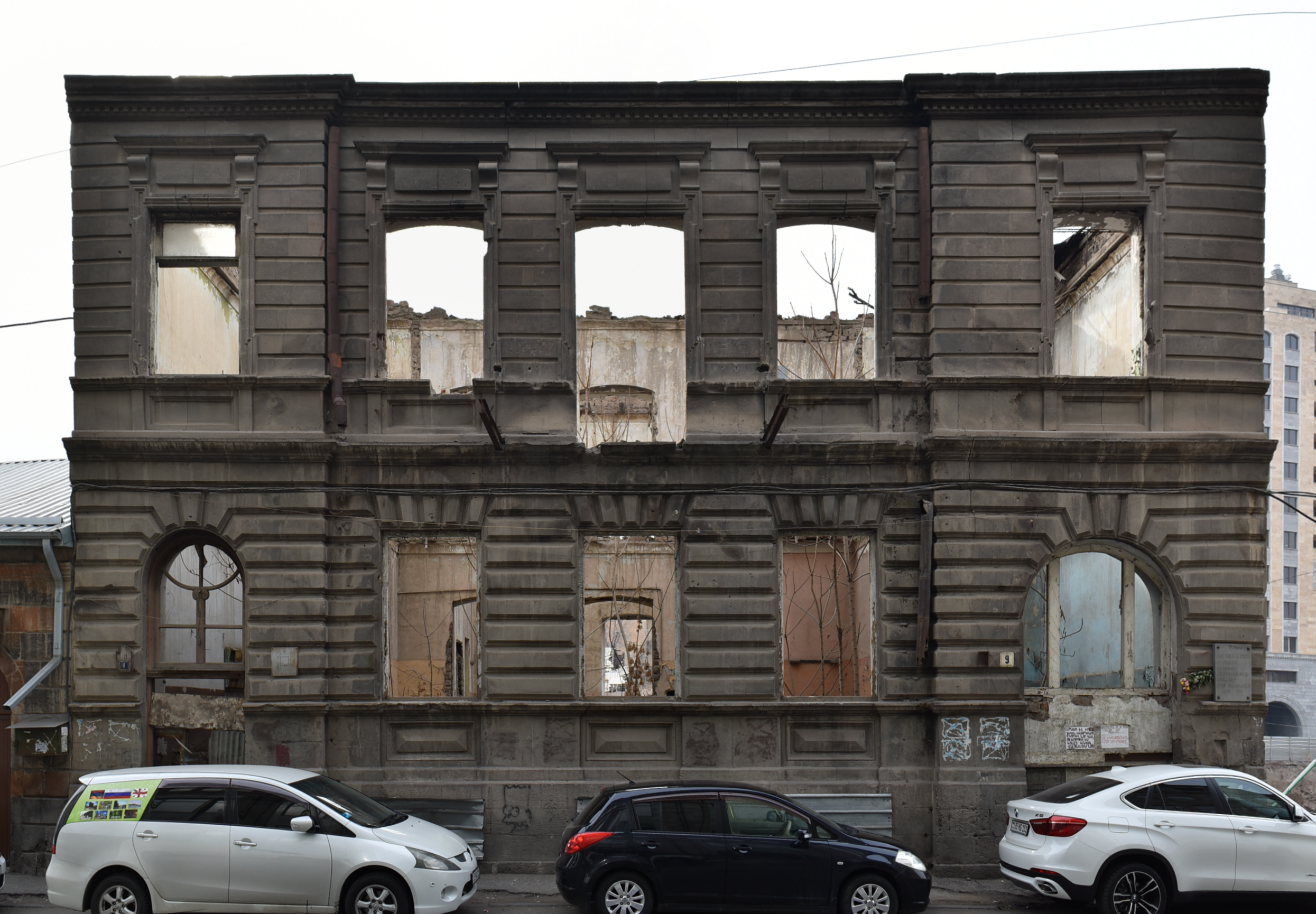
The house where Aram Manukian lived in Yerevan between 1917 and 1919

=== Manukian's house in Yerevan ===
When Manukian moved to Yerevan in 1917, one of Yerevan's wealthiest citizens, Fadey Kalantarian, donated to him a two-story house in the center of the town, built in 1910 by the architect Boris Mehrabian. In 1919 the street where his house was located was renamed Aram Street. After Soviet rule was established it was renamed after the Bolshevik Suren Spandaryan. In 1991, after independence, it was again renamed Aram Street.

The house, located at 9 Aram Street, is now a roofless shell and "ignored" by the authorities. The property is owned by Glendale Hills real estate development company since 2005. According to reporter Tatul Hakobyan, the house is owned by the Swiss-Armenian businessman Vartan Sirmakes, who is the CEO of the watchmaking company Franck Muller and founder of ArmSwissBank.

== In popular culture ==
In 2007 the Public Television of Armenia produced a 50-minute-long documentary about Manukian.

== Bibliography ==
About Manukian

- Արամը. Մահուան Յիսնամեակին Առթիւ (Aram: On Fiftieth Anniversary of Death) (in Armenian). Beirut, Lebanon: Hamazkayin Printing. 1969.
  - Արամը. Մահուան յիսնամեակին առթիւ (Aram: On Fiftieth Anniversary of Death) (PDF) (in Armenian). Yerevan: Mikael Varantian Printing. 1991. Archived from the original on 2014-09-20. [first printing in Armenia]
- Asryan, Armen; Karapetyan, Mher (2005). Արամ Մանուկյան. կյանքը և գործը [Aram Manukian: Life and Work] (in Armenian). Yerevan: Lusakn.
- Asryan, Armen (2005). "Արամ Մանուկյանը հայոց մեծ ողբերգության տարիներին [Aram Manukyan in the Years of the Great Armenian Tragedy]". Patma-Banasirakan Handes (in Armenian). 1 (1): 42–54. ISSN 0135-0536.
- Virabyan, Amatuni, ed. (2009). Արամ Մանուկյան. Փաստաթղթեր և նյութերի ժողովածու [Aram Manukian: Collection of documents and materials] (PDF) (in Armenian). Yerevan: National Archives of Armenia. Archived from the original on 2014-09-20.
- Արամ Մանուկյան. ազգային և պետական գործիչը (Հոդվածների ժողովածու) [Aram Manukian: The National and State Figure (Collection of essays)] (in Armenian). Yerevan: Institute of History of the Armenian Academy of Sciences. 2010.

General

- Hovannisian, Richard (1971). The Republic of Armenia: The First Year, 1918–1919. University of California Press. ISBN 9780520018051.
- Walker, Christopher J. (1990). Armenia: The Survival of a Nation (PDF) (revised second ed.). New York: St. Martin's Press. ISBN 9780312042301. Archived from the original (PDF) on 2006-05-02.
- Adalian, Rouben Paul (2010). Historical Dictionary of Armenia. Lanham, Maryland: Scarecrow Press. ISBN 978-0-8108-7450-3.
- Kévorkian, Raymond H. (2011). The Armenian Genocide: A Complete History. London: I. B. Tauris. ISBN 9781848855618.
- Libaridian, Gerard J. (1991). Armenia at the crossroads: democracy and nationhood in the post-Soviet era: essays, interviews, and speeches by the leaders of the national democratic movement in Armenia. Watertown, Massachusetts: Blue Crane Nooks. p. 19. ISBN 9780962871511.
- Payaslian, Simon (2007). The History of Armenia. New York: Palgrave Macmillan. ISBN 978-1-4039-7467-9.
- Miller, Donald E.; Touryan Miller, Lorna (2003). Armenia: portraits of survival and hope. Berkeley, California: University of California Press. ISBN 9780520234925.
- Melikyan, Vahan (2010). "Երևանը և Երևանի նահանգը հոկտեմբերյան հեղաշրջումից հետո [Yerevan and the Yerevan Province after the October Revolution]". Patma-Banasirakan Handes (in Armenian). 3 (3): 72–93. ISSN 0135-0536.
- Khurshudyan, Lendrush (1999). "1918 թ. Մայիսյան հերոսամարտերը և Հայաստանի Հանրապետության պատմական նշանակությունն ու դասերը [The May Heroic Battles of 1918 and Historic Significance and Lessons of the Republic of Armenia]". Patma-Banasirakan Handes (in Armenian). 2–3 (2–3): 27–38. ISSN 0135-0536.
- Sahakian, R. O. (1995). "Վասպուրականի հայության գոյամարտը 1915 թվականին [The Self-Defence of the Vaspurakan Armenians in 1915]". Patma-Banasirakan Handes (in Armenian). 1 (1): 19–30. ISSN 0135-0536.
- Hаrutyunian, A. (2002). "Վան-Վասպուրականի ագգաբնակչության 1915թ. հուլիսյան գաղթը [Migration of the Van-Vaspurakan Population in July 1915]". Lraber Hasarakakan Gitutyunneri (in Armenian). 2 (2): 46–58. ISSN 0320-8117.
- Suny, Ronald Grigor (2015). "They Can Live in the Desert but Nowhere Else": A History of the Armenian Genocide. Princeton University Press. ISBN 978-1-4008-6558-1.
