= Chipatá, Santander =

Coordinates: 6°03′N 73°38′W

Chipatá
- Municipality and town
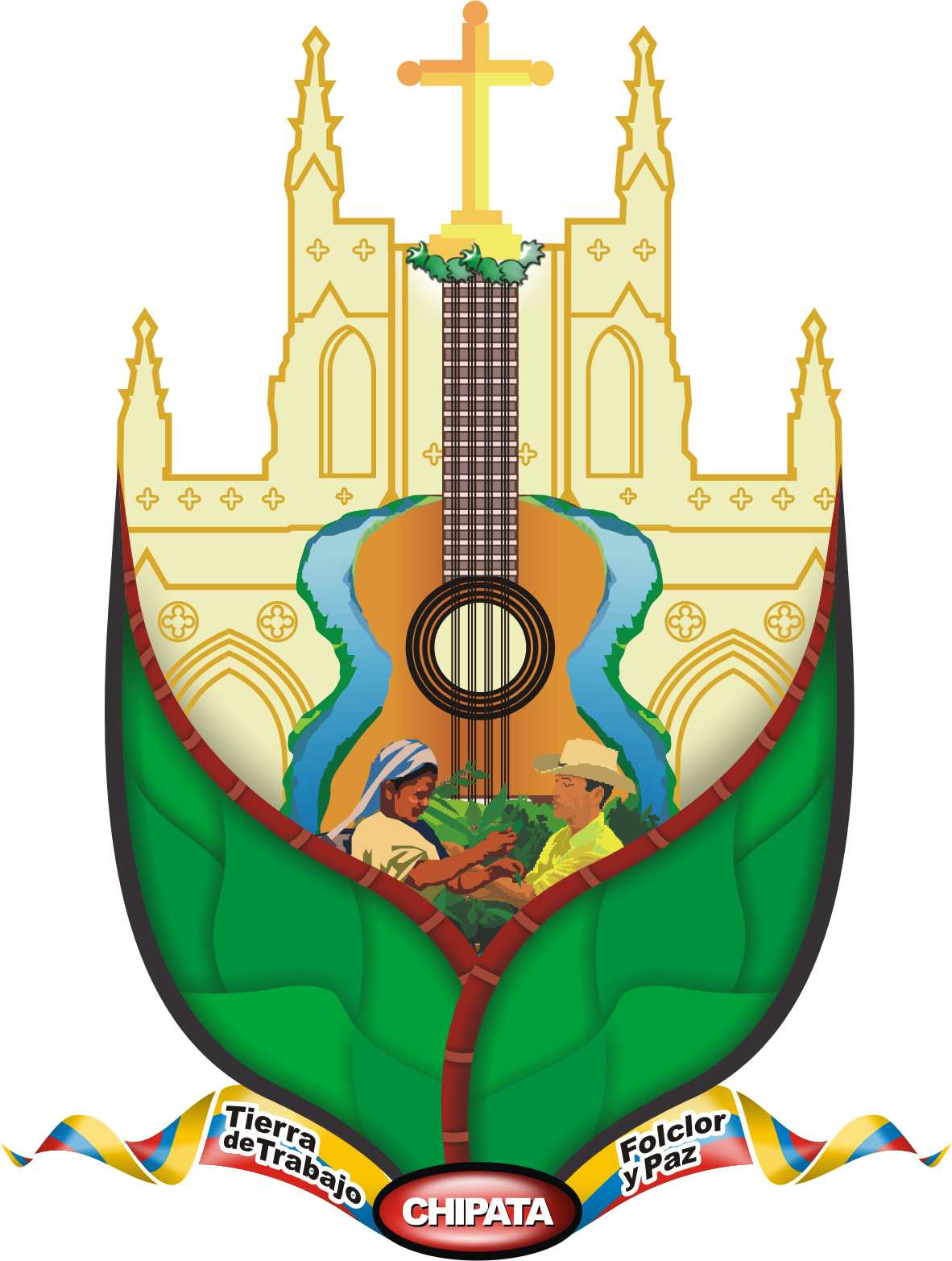
- Flag Coat of arms

- Location of the municipality and town of Chipata in the Santander department of Colombia
- Country: Colombia
- Department: Santander Department
- Province: Vélez Province
- Founded: 8 March 1537
- Founder: Gonzalo Jiménez de Quesada

Government
  - Mayor: Belisario Romero Chávez (2016-2019)

Area
  - Municipality and town: 94.17 km^{2} (36.36 sq mi)
  - Urban: 14.12 km^{2} (5.45 sq mi)
- Elevation: 1,820 m (5,970 ft)

Population (2015)
  - Municipality and town: 5,088
  - Density: 54.03/km^{2} (139.9/sq mi)
  - Urban: 688
- Time zone: UTC-5 (Colombia Standard Time)
- Website: Official website

Chipatá is a town and municipality in the Vélez Province, part of the Santander Department in northeastern Colombia. The urban centre is situated at an altitude of 1,820 metres (5,970 ft) at a distance of 227 kilometres (141 mi) from the department capital Bucaramanga and at 237 kilometres (147 mi) from the national capital Bogotá. The municipality borders Vélez in the south and west, La Paz in the north, San Benito, Güepsa and Barbosa in the east.

== Etymology ==
Chipatá is named after cacique Chipatá and means in Chibcha: chi = "our", pa = "father", tá = "farmland"; "farmland of our father".

== History ==
The area of Chipatá was one of the northernmost territories of the Muisca, bordered by Guane territories to the north and east. It was ruled by a cacique, who was independent within the loose Muisca Confederation.

Modern Chipatá was the first settlement founded by conquistador Gonzalo Jiménez de Quesada and his brother, on March 8, 1537, during his expedition of conquest.

After the local elections of October 2015, where Belisario Romero Chávez gained the position of mayor with a difference of 44 votes, supporters of his contestant Emilse Santamaría Castillo destroyed a school and molested the former mayor Argemiro Angulo.

== Economy ==
The main economical activities of Chipatá are agriculture and livestock farming. Among the agricultural products cultivated are maize, coffee, blackberries, pitaya, aloe, and stevia.
