= Barbosa, Santander =

Coordinates: 5.933°N 73.621°W

- Municipality and town
- Flag Coat of arms

- Location of the municipality and town of Barbosa, Santander in the Santander Department of Colombia.
- Country: Colombia
- Department: Santander Department

Area
  - Municipality and town: 46.67 km^{2} (18.02 sq mi)
  - Urban: 3.59 km^{2} (1.39 sq mi)

Population (2018 census)
  - Municipality and town: 31,050
  - Density: 665.3/km^{2} (1,723/sq mi)
  - Urban: 23,249
  - Urban density: 6,480/km^{2} (16,800/sq mi)
- Demonym: Barboseño -a
- Time zone: UTC-5 (Colombia Standard Time)
- Climate: Af
- Website: www.barbosa-santander.gov.co

Barbosa (founded May 24, 1940) is a town in the Santander Department in northeastern Colombia. It is a municipality of the province of Vélez.

Barbosa is the second Santander municipality by the southern entrance of the department.

== History ==
Barbosa has been called "Puerta de oro de Santander" (The Golden Gate of Santander) due to its privileged geographical location: its colorful valley on the banks of the Suarez River has allowed it to become a nerve center to an extensive region. The roads that converge in the area have made it a powerful municipality in the department.

The name Barbosa is a tribute to the Spanish general Heliodoro Barbosa, who fought against the Ubazas Indians, settlers of the region. They are said to be the most accurate macana archery marksmen. The town was originally called Cite, and began as a corregimiento founded by Martín Galeano on 24 May 1539. It is considered the first town founded in the department of Santander, since Vélez was founded on July 3, 1539. For many years it was considered a municipality. Barbosa first gained legal recognition on October 1, 1939 as a corregimiento under Our Lady of Cite. Its unusual development, caused by its rapid growth of business, led to the Assembly of the department approving ordinance No. 42 on June 21, 1940. This turned Barbosa into a municipal seat.

== Conquest and colonization ==
The main original people groups existing by the lands crossed by Martín Galeano were the following:

- Agataes, with Chipatá as head.
- Clans and rancherios in Guavatá, Ubasá, and Güepsa.
- Yariguíes or Lloriquíes, watered by the mountainous area that extends behind Vélez to the north.
- Guanes and Chanchones by the oriental margin of the Sarabita River and slopes of the Mochuelo or Fonce.
- To the east, the Chalalaes or Charalás.

Neither one nor the other was concentrated in large populations. They were clans or family groups scattered about, with dissimilar dialects and customs. For that reason Galeano and its people were surprised when they undertook their campaign, they thought they would find great towns and a lot of gentility, in the end they only found a few small groups and tough fighters.

== Arrival of the conquerors ==
The conquistadors first arrived on these lands in 1539, when the conqueror Martín Galeano, following the orders of Don Gonzalo Jiménez de Quesada, visited the Santanderean mountains. The purpose was to find some similar to those of Vélez (Spain). In May 1539, Martín Galeano, having passed through different Guanes territories and fought several battles with the Indians, camped on the banks of the Suarez River at what would become the location of Cite. The mission was to found the city of Vélez, but circumstances did not allow this. After citing several names for the camp they managed to reach an agreement on the name Cite. The soldiers encamped in this place, exhausted by fatigue, and began to wonder about the name, saying ... "Partner Cite yourself a name, Cite yourself a name."

The region was inhabited by the Ubasas Indians, who were said to be the most accurate arrow shooters with bow. The name of Barbosa comes from the name of Captain Helidoro Barbosa, who fought the tribe. In this battle, the Spaniards were on the verge of succumbing, but after several days of battles became victorious. Martín Galeano, in recognition of the commander, raised a bridge on the Suarez river which he called "Puente Barbosa."

Among the first inhabitants of Barbosa are the families with the surnames Becaría, Camacho, Escamilla, Ulloa, Moncada, Chaparro, Fajardo, Cely, Ríos and González.

== Geography ==
=== Geographical review ===
The municipality of Barbosa is located in the extreme south of the Department of Santander, in limits with the department of Boyacá, in the province of Vélez and Ricaurte, on the banks of the Suarez River between the mountains that make up the Eastern Cordillera, at a distance from the capital of the country of 190 km and of Bucaramanga, at 214 km. Territorially it has a strategic location on the main national paved road No. 45 that connects Bogota with Bucaramanga. This has led to Barbosa being known as the "Puerta de Oro de Santander".

The municipal capital of Barbosa is located on the left bank of the Suarez River, it has the coordinates at 05° 55' 57" North latitude and 73° 37' 16" West longitude, following the Greenwich meridian. The total area of the Municipality is 46.43 km^{2}. This areas includes the rural area 1588 meters above sea level in the north and limits in Vélez, Güepsa at 2050 meters above sea level.

=== Limits of the municipality ===
Barbosa borders the municipality of Güepsa in the north; the municipality of Puente Nacional in the south, the Suárez river and the municipality of Moniquirá (Boyacá) in the east, and the municipalities of Vélez and Guavatá in the west. The border between Barbosa and Vélez travels along the blade of Santa Rosa, at a length of 7.5 km. Towards the southwestern end, the border includes Guavatá after about half a kilometer. The southern border travels along the Semiza creek for three and a half kilometer, where it joins the Suárez river. From there, it borders the department of Boyacá, which, at the height of the Liberty Bridge, on the national highway (Tunja-Bucaramanga), describes a wide north-facing arch. The length of the eastern boundary on the bank is about 14.3 km.

The municipality of Barbosa connects to Bogota via the National Bridge, Chiquinquirá, a paved road, and begins the transversal of Carare (Puerto Berrío, on the Magdalena River). Barbosa also has an airport.

Total extension: 46.43 km^{2}

=== Climate ===
Barbosa's climate is tropical. There is significant rainfall throughout the year. The climate classification of Köppen-Geiger is Af. The average annual temperature in Barbosa is 72 °F. The rainfall is 87 inches per year. Between the hottest months of the year, from January to March, the average temperature is 77 °F. The coldest month of the year is December, where the average temperature is 69 °F.

Climate data for Barbosa/Moniquirá (Bertha), elevation 1,700 m (5,600 ft), (1981–2010)
Month	Jan	Feb	Mar	Apr	May	Jun	Jul	Aug	Sep	Oct	Nov	Dec	Year
Mean daily maximum °C (°F)	26.7 (80.1)	26.7 (80.1)	27.0 (80.6)	26.5 (79.7)	26.3 (79.3)	26.0 (78.8)	25.8 (78.4)	26.1 (79.0)	26.1 (79.0)	25.7 (78.3)	26.0 (78.8)	26.2 (79.2)	26.3 (79.3)
Daily mean °C (°F)	19.0 (66.2)	19.3 (66.7)	19.6 (67.3)	19.5 (67.1)	19.3 (66.7)	19.1 (66.4)	18.7 (65.7)	18.9 (66.0)	18.9 (66.0)	18.8 (65.8)	19.1 (66.4)	19.0 (66.2)	19.1 (66.4)
Mean daily minimum °C (°F)	12.8 (55.0)	13.1 (55.6)	13.6 (56.5)	14.5 (58.1)	14.4 (57.9)	13.4 (56.1)	12.5 (54.5)	12.6 (54.7)	13.0 (55.4)	13.9 (57.0)	14.1 (57.4)	13.2 (55.8)	13.4 (56.1)
Average precipitation mm (inches)	62.0 (2.44)	93.3 (3.67)	111.9 (4.41)	236.0 (9.29)	298.2 (11.74)	186.7 (7.35)	152.3 (6.00)	150.8 (5.94)	208.1 (8.19)	240.8 (9.48)	177.4 (6.98)	88.9 (3.50)	2,006.3 (78.99)
Average precipitation days (≥ 1.0 mm)	11	15	15	24	26	20	19	20	23	25	20	14	234
Average relative humidity (%)	74	74	74	78	80	77	75	74	76	79	79	77	77
Mean monthly sunshine hours	176.7	163.7	151.9	126.0	120.9	141.0	151.9	148.8	141.0	145.7	153.0	167.4	1,788
Mean daily sunshine hours	5.7	5.8	4.9	4.2	3.9	4.7	4.9	4.8	4.7	4.7	5.1	5.4	4.9
Source: Instituto de Hidrologia Meteorologia y Estudios Ambientales
