= Ishkhan =

Ishkhan may refer to:

- Ishkhan (title), an Armenian medieval feudal title, meaning "prince"
- Ishkhan (fedayi), an Armenian freedom fighter born Nikoghayos Mikaelian
- Sevan trout (Salmo ischchan), an endemic fish species of Lake Sevan, Armenia
- Ishkhani, a monastery in Artvin Province, Turkey
