= Ishkhanian =

Ishkhanian (Armenian: Իշխանյան) is an Armenian surname. Notable people with the surname include:

- Avetik Ishkhanian (1955–2025), Armenian human rights activist
- Rafayel Ishkhanian (1922–1995), Armenian linguist, philologist and historian
- Yeghishe Ishkhanian (1886–1975), Armenian politician and statesman
- Hagop Ishkanian (born 1938), Armenian and American sculptor
