= Arshak Vramian =

Armenian revolutionary

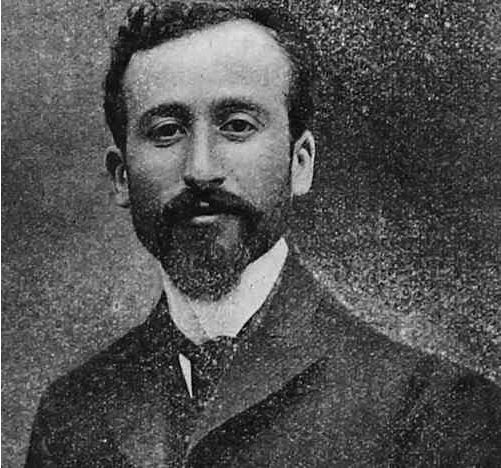

Member of the Ottoman parliament

Personal details
- Born: Onnik Derdzakian; 22 March 1870/1871 Constantinople, Ottoman Empire
- Died: 17 April 1915 Arapu Tsor, near Bitlis, Ottoman Empire
- Citizenship: Persia; United States (after 1904)

Arshak or Arshag Vramian (Armenian: Արշակ Վռամեան, (Note: Reformed orthography: Արշակ Վռամյան) born Onnik Derdzakian; (Note: Օննիկ Դերձակեան, also spelled Tertsakian) 22 March 1870/1871 – 17 April 1915) was an Armenian revolutionary and a leading member of the Armenian Revolutionary Federation. He worked as an ARF activist in his native Constantinople before fleeing the police. He worked for the party in Bulgaria and Romania before moving to Geneva, where he served on the party's Western Bureau and edited the party organ Droshak. He lived in the United States from 1899 to 1907; while there, he edited the party newspaper Hairenik. He returned to the Ottoman Empire after the Young Turk Revolution restored the Ottoman constitution. He was a member of the Ottoman parliament elected from Van Province. He was killed by the Ottoman authorities in April 1915 at the start of the Armenian genocide.

== Biography ==
Arshak Vramian (born Onnik Derdzakian) was born on 22 March 1870 (Note: This is the birthdate given on Vramian's US naturalization record from 1904. Other sources give 1871 as the year of his birth.) or 1871 in Constantinople. According to his United States naturalization record, his parents were originally from Persia, and he was born a citizen of that country. He received his primary education in his hometown, then attended the Gevorgian Seminary in Etchmiadzin, graduating in 1889. He met Armenian Revolutionary Federation (ARF) member Hovhannes Yousoufian in 1894 and soon became a member of the party. By 1895, he became secretary of the ARF Constantinople Central Committee and became the leading ARF figure in the city after Yousoufian's departure. He used the pseudonyms Vahab and Varaz. In 1896, he participated in the preparation of the occupation of the Ottoman Bank and was arrested, but managed to escape. In 1897, he worked as an ARF propagandist in Bulgaria and Romania. In 1898, he traveled to Geneva. At the ARF Second World Congress in 1898, he was elected a member of the party's Western Bureau. He also worked for the party's official organ Droshak and served as its editor in 1899. He attended university lectures while in Geneva. In 1899, he traveled to the United States and worked as a party activist, playing a major role in the establishment of the party's organization in America. He also edited the party newspaper Hairenik. He became a naturalized American citizen in 1904.

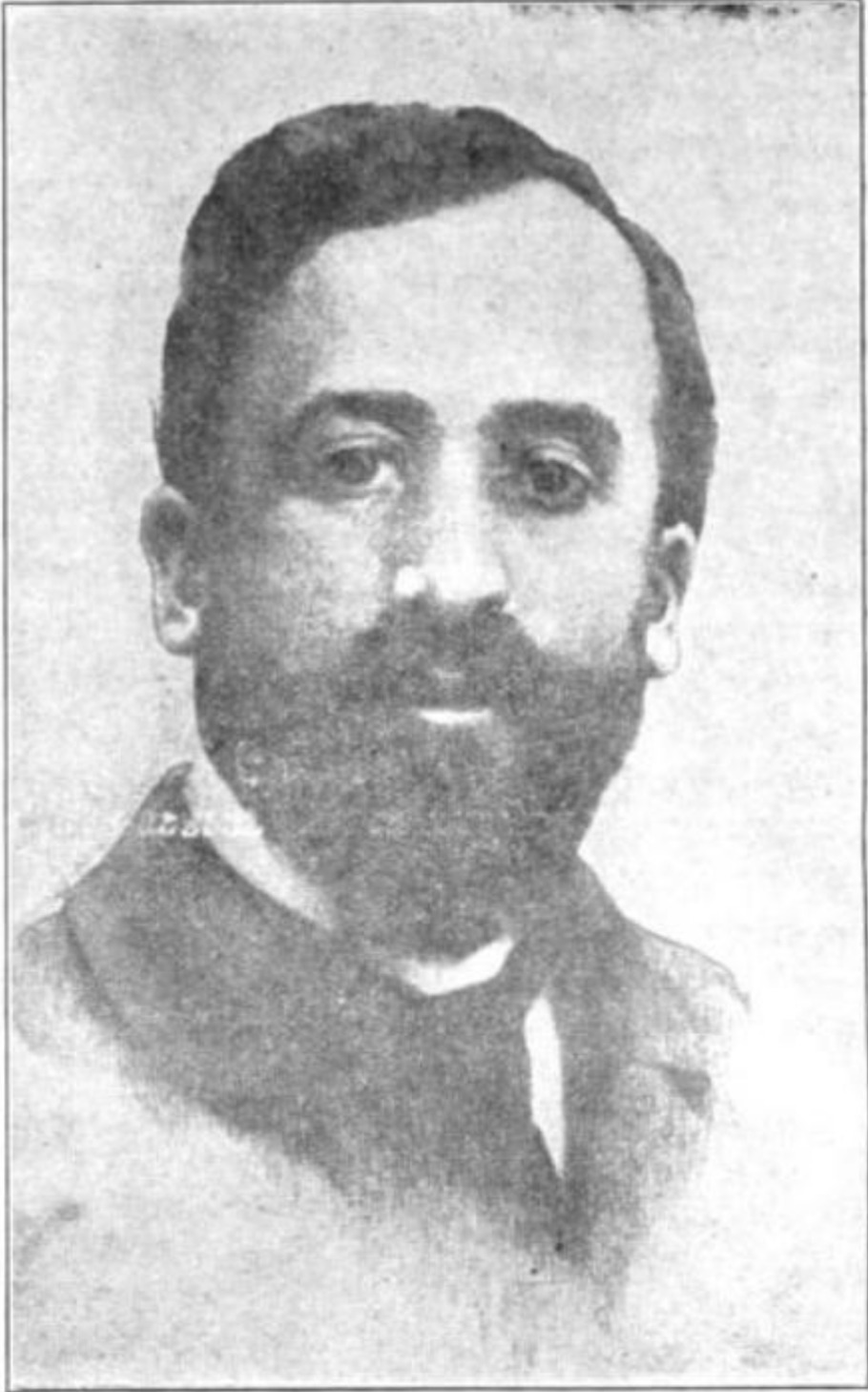
Photograph of Arshak Vramian published in Hairenik Monthly in May 1923

Vramian left America in 1907 and stayed in the Caucasus for some time, then traveled to Van after the restoration of the Ottoman constitution in 1908. He then returned to Constantinople, where he continued his work in the Western Bureau and joined the editorial staff of the newspaper Azadamard. In 1910, he was appointed to the "Joint Body," a body consisting of three ARF members and three members of the Committee of Union and Progress. He was elected to the Ottoman parliament in 1913 as a representative for Van. He moved to Van and was killed at the beginning of the Armenian genocide on the orders of the Ottoman governor Cevdet Bey, who was Vramian's friend and former classmate. Vramian and ARF leader Aram Manukian were summoned by Cevdet Bey on the morning of 17 April 1915. Vramian and Aram were unaware that another ARF leader, Ishkhan, had been killed the previous day. Vramian warned Aram to ignore the governor's summons, but he himself went. He was last seen that evening guarded by gendarmes at the port of Agants. He was killed in an area called Arapu Tsor, not far from Bitlis, although the exact location of his death is unknown.
