= Ishkhan (title) =

Ishkhan (Armenian: իշխան) was a feudal title in medieval Armenia, literally meaning prince. The word originates from Iranian *xšāna- (cf. Sogdian axšāwan, "king"). The title ishkhan was used both in parallel and in substitute of other Armenian feudal titles, such as nakharar, paron, douks, ter, or melik. Ishkhan is also an Armenian masculine first name.

== Given names ==
- Ishkhan (1883–1915), Armenian fedayi and revolutionary
- Ishkhanik of Hereti, 10th-century Georgian king
- Ishkhan Geloyan (born 1982), Armenian footballer
- Ishkhan Saghatelyan (born 1982), Armenian politician and parliamentarian

== Surname ==
- Moushegh Ishkhan (1913–1990), Armenian diaspora poet, writer and educator
- Peter Ishkhans, American hairstylist

== See also ==
- Ishkhanian, surname derived from the name

== Sources ==
- Jones, Lynn (2007). Between Islam and Byzantium: Aght'amar and the Visual Construction of Medieval Armenian Rulership. Ashgate Publishing. ISBN 978-0754638520.
- Schmitt, R.; Bailey, H. W. (1986). "Armenia and Iran iv. Iranian influences in Armenian Language". Encyclopaedia Iranica, Vol. II, Fasc. 4-5. pp. 445–465.
