= Guavatá =

Coordinates: 5°57′N 73°42′W

- Municipality and town
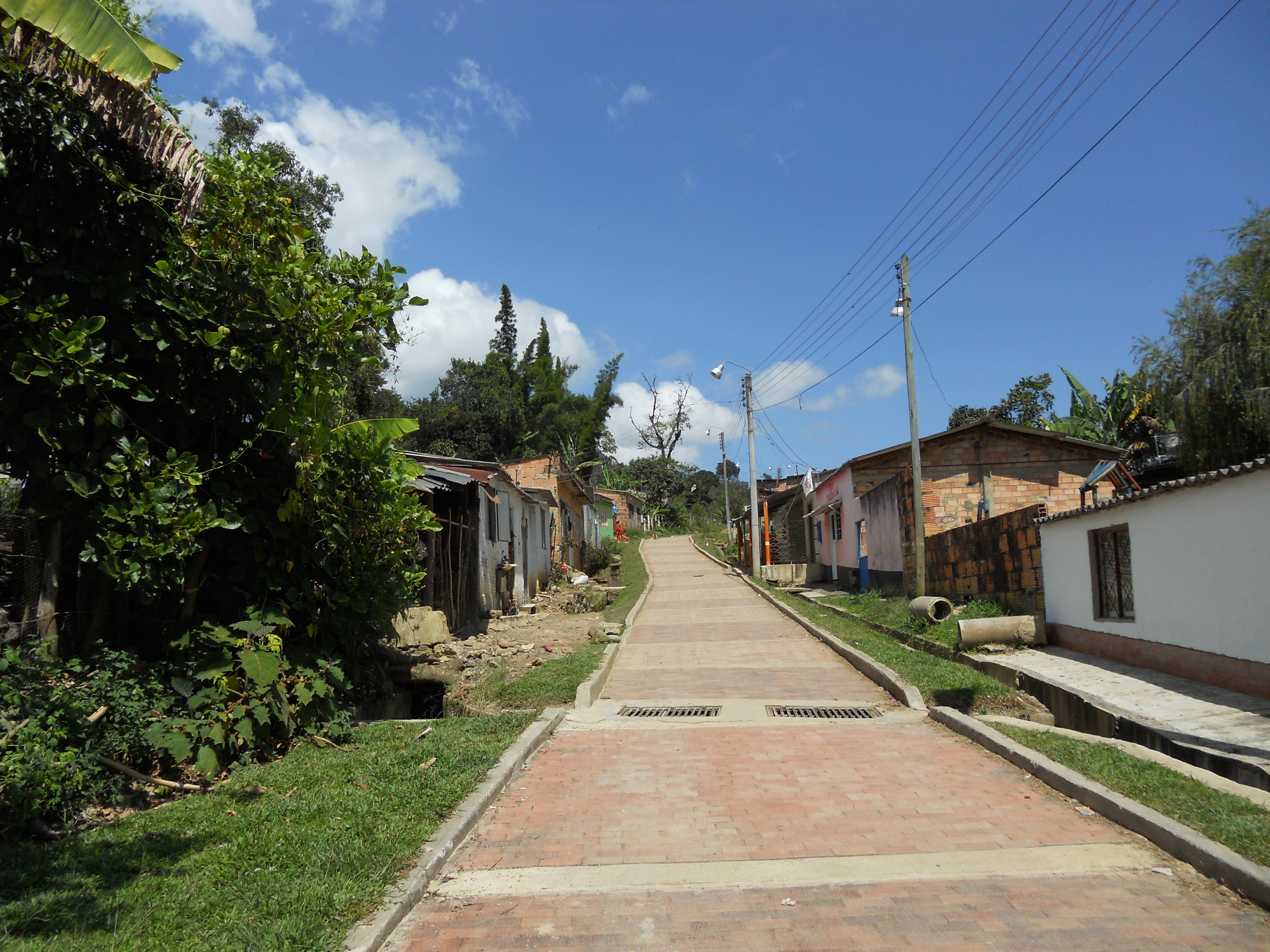
- View of Guavatá

- Flag

- Location of the municipality and town of Guavata in the Santander Department of Colombia.
- Country: Colombia
- Department: Santander Department
- Established: 6 February 1542
- Elevation: 2,000 m (6,600 ft)

Population (2015)
  - Total: 3,679
- Time zone: UTC-5 (Colombia Standard Time)

Guavatá is a town and municipality in the Santander Department in northeastern Colombia.
