= Lendrush Khurshudyan =

Armenian historian

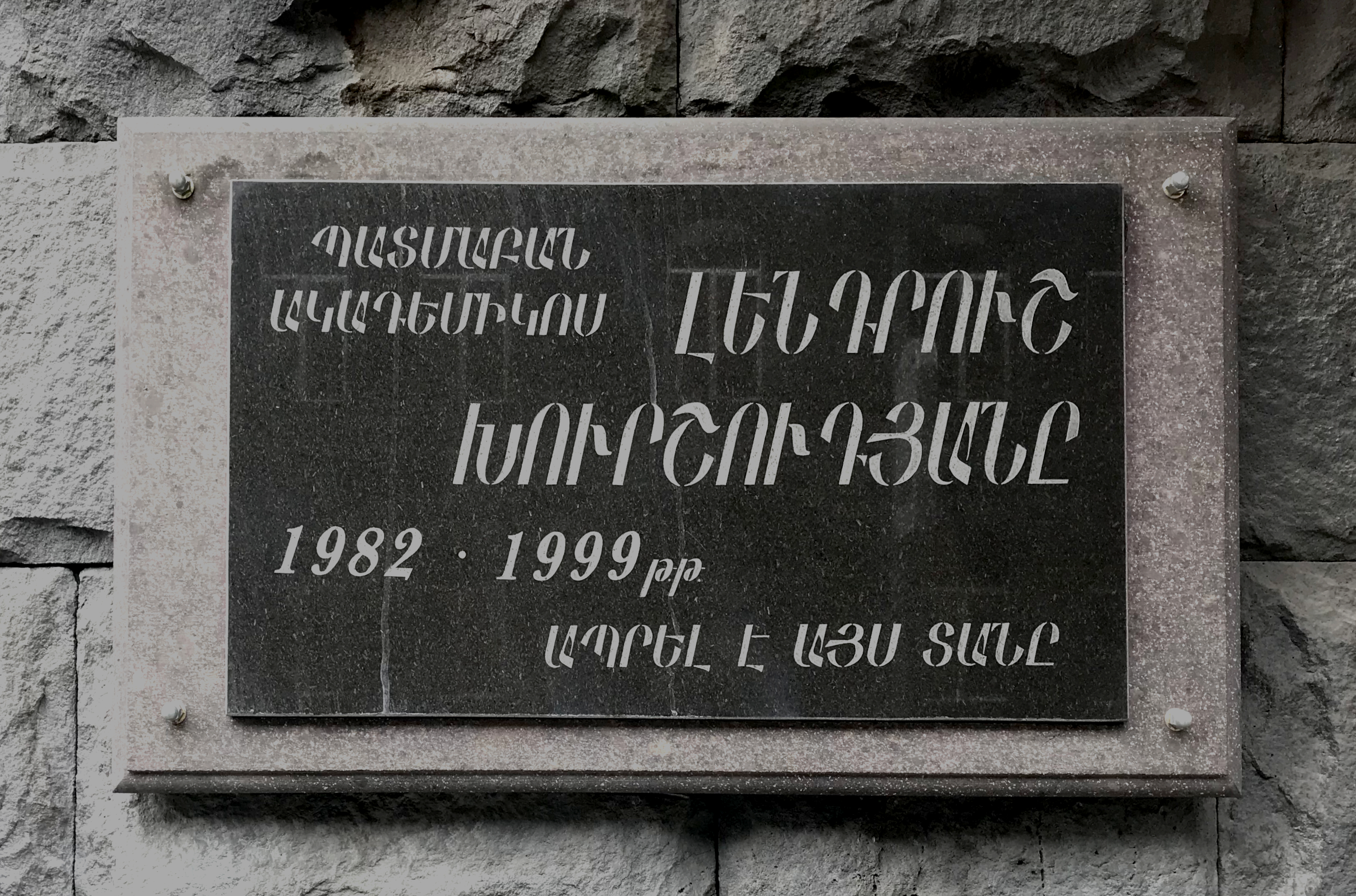
Lendrush Khurshudyan's plaque in Yerevan

Lendrush Arshaki Khurshudyan (Armenian: Լենդրուշ Արշակի Խուրշուդյան, 1 May 1927 – 7 June 1999) was an Armenian historian. He was a Doctor of History, Professor, an academician of the Armenian Academy of Sciences.

He was born in the village of Shinuhayr, Goris region, Armenian SSR. From 1946 to 1951 he studied at Yerevan State University.

Since 1977, he headed the Chair of Armenian history at the Yerevan State University. His works are dedicated to the modern Armenian and Transcaucasian history. He died in 1999 in Yerevan.

== Selected works ==
- Khurshudyan, Lendrush (1999). "1918 թ. Մայիսյան հերոսամարտերը և Հայաստանի Հանրապետության պատմական նշանակությունն ու դասերը [The May Heroic Battles of 1918 and Historic Significance and Lessons of the Republic of Armenia]". Patma-Banasirakan Handes (in Armenian) (2–3): 27–38. ISSN 0135-0536.
