= Varvara Sahakyan =

Armenian politician

Member of Parliament
- In office 1919–1920

Personal details
- Died: 1934; Beirut, Lebanon

Varvara Sahakyan (died 1934) was an Armenian politician. In 1919 she was elected to parliament, becoming one of the first three female MPs in the country.

== Biography ==
Sahakyan married Avetik Sahakyan, who became the first Chairman of the Parliament of Armenia. A member of the Armenian Revolutionary Federation, she was a candidate in the June 1919 parliamentary elections, and was one of three women elected alongside Perchuhi Partizpanyan-Barseghyan and Katarine Zalyan-Manukyan.

After the Bolshevik takeover in 1920, Avetik was imprisoned. Following his release, the couple and their children fled on foot to Tabriz in Persia, before settling in Iraq. However, the climate affected her health, and the family relocated to Beirut. She became involved in the local Armenian Relief Cross, but died in 1934.
