= Bedros Kapamajian =

Ottoman mayor and businessman

Bedros Kapamajian (Armenian: Պետրոս Քափամաճեան) (1840 – 1912 in Van), was an Armenian citizen of the Ottoman Empire, a textile importer, member of the Van Executive Council, and mayor of the town of Van.

== Life ==
Kapamajian was appointed the mayor of Van on February 2, 1908. However, some sources put the date of his first election as mayor in 1909. He was elected twice on the strength of both Muslim and non-Muslim votes because of his successful efforts improving the local economy (including the first regular municipal boat service in Lake Van).

He was strongly supported by the merchant class of Van, who were mostly Armenian. He worked closely with the central government and the governor to enact local reforms. This put him in conflict with the Dashnaks, who have been agitating against the Ottoman state throughout Eastern provinces. The Armenian Revolutionary Federation (a.k.a. ARF) accused Kapamajian of being a puppet of the Ottoman Government.

Many people attended Mayor Kapamajian's funeral, including foreign consuls, Van Armenians, and residents of Van who weren't Armenian. He was buried in the Armenian cemetery in the Bağlar district.

After Kapamajian's assassination, all opposition to Dashnaks and their policies by Armenians ceased.
