= El Guacamayo =

Coordinates: 6°20′N 73°28′W

- Municipality and town
- Flag

- Location of the municipality and town of El Guacamayo in the Santander Department of Colombia.
- Country: Colombia
- Department: Santander Department

Population
  - Total: 2,303
- Time zone: UTC-5 (Colombia Standard Time)

El Guacamayo is a town and municipality in the Santander Department in northeastern Colombia.

== Climate ==
El Guacamayo has a subtropical highland climate (Köppen Cfb) with warm afternoons, cool to comfortable mornings, and very heavy rainfall year-round.

Climate data for El Guacamayo
Month	Jan	Feb	Mar	Apr	May	Jun	Jul	Aug	Sep	Oct	Nov	Dec	Year
Mean daily maximum °C (°F)	23.1 (73.6)	23.3 (73.9)	23.4 (74.1)	22.7 (72.9)	22.4 (72.3)	22.4 (72.3)	22.9 (73.2)	22.9 (73.2)	22.5 (72.5)	21.9 (71.4)	22.2 (72.0)	22.5 (72.5)	22.7 (72.8)
Daily mean °C (°F)	17.1 (62.8)	17.4 (63.3)	17.7 (63.9)	17.6 (63.7)	17.5 (63.5)	17.3 (63.1)	17.0 (62.6)	17.0 (62.6)	17.1 (62.8)	17.1 (62.8)	17.3 (63.1)	17.0 (62.6)	17.3 (63.1)
Mean daily minimum °C (°F)	11.2 (52.2)	11.6 (52.9)	12.0 (53.6)	12.6 (54.7)	12.7 (54.9)	12.2 (54.0)	11.2 (52.2)	11.2 (52.2)	11.8 (53.2)	12.3 (54.1)	12.4 (54.3)	11.5 (52.7)	11.9 (53.4)
Average rainfall mm (inches)	154.0 (6.06)	166.8 (6.57)	276.4 (10.88)	406.7 (16.01)	526.6 (20.73)	378.9 (14.92)	341.7 (13.45)	412.4 (16.24)	461.0 (18.15)	480.8 (18.93)	407.0 (16.02)	226.4 (8.91)	4,238.7 (166.87)
Average rainy days	9	9	14	21	23	19	19	21	22	23	19	13	212
Source 1: Instituto de Hidrologia Meteorologia y Estudios Ambientales
Source 2:
