= Ishkhan (fedayi) =

Armenian fedayi

- Նիկողաեոս Պողոս Միքաելեան
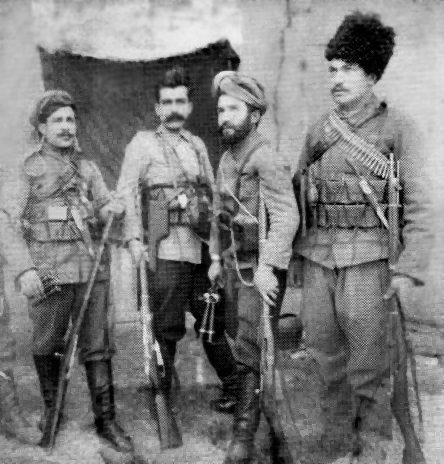
- The ARF leaders in Van. From left to right: Harutyun, Aram Manukian, Ishkhan and Sogho
- Born: Nikoghayos Poghos Mikaelian; 1881
- Died: 1915 (aged 33–34); Van, Van Vilayet, Ottoman Empire
- Military career
- Service years: ?—1915
- Nickname: Ishkhan
- Conflicts: Armenian National Liberation Movement; Khanasor Expedition; Siege of Van

Ishkhan (Armenian: Իշխան, "prince"; 1883 – 1915), born Nikoghayos Mikayelian, and also known as Nigol, was an Armenian fedayi, a member of the Armenian Revolutionary Federation. Along with Aram Manukian and Arshak Vramian, he was a leading figure in Van just before and during the early stages of World War I. He was well known for arming Armenian villages in eastern Anatolia and organizing their defences to defend themselves from attacks and raids by Turks and Kurds. He was killed on 17 April 1915 just before the Turks besieged Van.
