= Katarine Zalyan-Manukyan =

Armenian politician

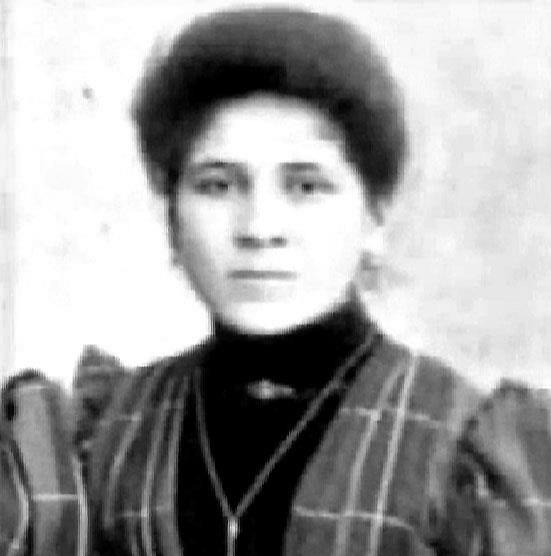

Member of Parliament
- In office 1919–1920

Personal details
- Died: 1965 Moscow, Soviet Union

Katarine Zalyan-Manukyan (died 1965) was an Armenian politician. In 1919 she was elected to parliament, becoming one of the first three female MPs in the country.

== Biography ==
Zalyan-Manukyan was a nurse and worked at orphanages. She married Aram Manukyan in 1917 had a daughter named Seda the following year. Manukyan was one of the founders of the First Republic of Armenia and became its first Minister of Internal Affairs in 1918. In the same year Katarine coordinated nursing volunteers at the Battle of Abaran and Sardarabad. Her husband died in January 1919 after contracting typhus.

A member of the Armenian Revolutionary Federation, Zalyan-Manukyan was a candidate in the June 1919 parliamentary elections, and was one of three women elected alongside Perchuhi Partizpanyan-Barseghyan and Varvara Sahakyan. As a member of parliament, she served on the health committee.

After the Bolshevik takeover in 1920, she relocated to Krasnodar in Russia. She returned to Armenia in 1927, before moving to Moscow. She died in 1965.
