= Berjouhi Bardizbanian-Parseghian =

Armenian pedagogue, writer and humanitarian worker

Perchuhi Partizpanyan-Barseghyan
- Պերճուհի Պարտիզպանյան-Բարսեղյան
- Born: Perchuhi Partizpanyan; 1886; Edirne, Adrianople Vilayet, Ottoman Empire
- Died: 18 May 1940 (aged 53–54); Paris, France
- Other names: Berjouhi Partizpanyan-Barseghyan, Perchouhi Barseghian, Perchuhi Barseghyan
- Occupations: Teacher, writer, humanitarian worker
- Years active: 1902–1939

Perchuhi Partizpanyan-Barseghyan (Armenian: Պերճուհի Պարտիզպանյան-Բարսեղյան, 1886 – 18 May 1940) was an Armenian pedagogue, writer and humanitarian worker. She was one of the first three women elected to serve as a member of the parliament with the formation of the First Republic of Armenia in 1919. After the fall of the republic, she briefly relocated to Bulgaria, before continuing her literary career in Paris. She received recognition for her short stories from the American anthologist, Edward J. O'Brien. She worked in the Nansen International Office for Refugees in Paris trying to assist Armenians who had been affected by the Armenian genocide.

== Early life ==
Perchuhi Partizpanyan was born in 1886 in Edirne, Adrianople Vilayet, Ottoman Empire. She was the daughter of a wealthy Armenian family. Along with her sister, Satenik, she attended high school in Philippopolis, Bulgaria. At a young age, she became inspired by revolutionary ideas of Rostom and his wife Lisa Melik Shahnazarian, who were operating an Armenian school there. When she returned home to Edirne, at sixteen, she met Sargis Barseghyan, an intellectual and member of the Armenian Revolutionary Federation, also known as the Dashnaktsutyun. He encouraged her to start the Armenian Women's Union, (Armenian: Հայ կանանց միություն), an organization to encourage other women to write and discuss Armenian literature and progressive ideas.

Resuming her studies, Partizpanyan attended college in Geneva studying literature and pedagogy. She began to publish writings under the pseudonym Etna, including several short stories which were later compiled and published as Փոթորիկէն վերջ (The End of the Storm).

== Career ==
After completing her education, Partizpanyan returned to Ottoman Armenia and began teaching first in Van and then in Giresun. In 1909, she married Sargis Barseghyan, who had become the head of the Dashnaktsutyun in Constantinople. They had a son before Sargis was arrested in March 1915 and executed on 30 April by the state as one of the first victims of the Armenian genocide. After the massacre of intellectuals, Barseghyan took her son and fled to Sofia, Bulgaria, but soon settled in Tbilisi and resumed teaching. She taught at St. Gayane Girls' School and later at Mariamian-Hovnanian Girls' School, both Armenian schools located in the capital of the Tiflis Governorate, of the Caucasus Viceroyalty of the Russian Empire.

When Armenia gained its independence from the Russian Empire and established the First Republic of Armenia on 28 May 1918, Barseghyan moved to Yerevan. Though not a women's right's activist, Barseghyan believed in public roles for women and along with other members of the Dashnaktsutyun worked to ensure that the new constitution provided for universal suffrage. She was socially active and worked with other women to provide care for orphans and refugees. When the first elections were held on 21 and 23 June 1919, Barseghyan was one of three women elected to serve in the 80-member parliament. The other two women who served were Varvara Sahakyan and Katarine Zalyan-Manukyan. They served until December 1920, when Red Army of Russia invaded Armenia.

With the collapse of the Republic, Barseghyan took her son and returned briefly to Sofia. Committed to serving on behalf of the Armenian people, she chose to live in exile in Paris, where she worked at the Nansen International Office for Refugees and continued her literary endeavors. One of her short stories received an award from the American anthologist, Edward J. O'Brien, and stories like Արփիկը (Arpik) and Օղակ մը շղթայէս (One Ring Chain) were translated into English and French. She published her memoirs, Խանձուած օրերը (Days of Distress), as a series in the American journal Hairenik between 1938 and 1939.

== Death and legacy ==
Barseghyan died on 18 May 1940 in Paris and was buried there in the tomb of Armenian intellectuals. Her son translated her memoirs into French and published them in Marseille in 2004. In 2016, Hakob Palian, writer and journalist, edited a new publication of them for Hamazkayin Publishing House of Beirut in honor of the 100th anniversary of the Armenian Genocide. Her works, but especially her memoir, are significant representations of the historic interwar period in Armenia's struggle and the role women played in protecting the nation and people in their quest for independence.

== Selected works ==
- Հայրենիքս (My Homeland), 1915 poem
- Barseghyan, Perchuhi (1932). Փոթորիկէն վերջ [The End of the Storm] (in Armenian). Paris, France: Imp. De Navarre. Archived from the original on 12 January 2019.
- Արփիկը (Arpik, short story)
- Օղակ մը շղթայէս (One Ring Chain, short story)
- Barseghyan, Perchuhi (2016). Palian, Hakob (ed.). Խանձված օրեր (in Armenian). Beirut, Lebanon: Hamazkayin Publishing House. "Days of Distress"
