= San Benito, Santander =

- Municipality and town
- Flag

- Location of the municipality and town of San Benito, Santander in the Santander Department of Colombia.
- Country: Colombia
- Department: Santander Department
- Time zone: UTC-5 (Colombia Standard Time)

San Benito is a town and municipality in the Santander Department in northeastern Colombia.
