= Rafayel Ishkhanian =

Armenian linguist, philologist and historian (1922–1995)

Rafayel Avetisi Ishkhanyan (Armenian: Ռաֆայել Ավետիսի Իշխանյան, 9 March 1922 – 6 February 1995) was an Armenian linguist, philologist and historian. He was a professor of the Yerevan State University.

== Biography ==
Ishkhanyan was born in Yerevan in 1922 to Bolshevik revolutionaries Avetis and Haykanush Ishkhanian. His father Avetis was executed in 1937 during the Great Purge. In 1939, Ishkhanyan entered the department of philology of Yerevan State University (YSU). He was called up for military service in 1940 and participated in World War II, during which he was wounded and taken prisoner, then released from imprisonment and continued his service. After demobilization, he continued his studies and graduated from YSU in 1949. In 1954 he graduated from the Moscow State Library Institute. In 1973 he defended his doctoral dissertation on the subject "History of the language of new Armenian literature".

From 1955 to 1963 he held various positions at the National Library of Armenia and at Matenadaran. From 1963 to 1992 he worked at the department of philology of Yerevan State University, teaching modern Armenian, dialect studies, and the history of Armenian literature and language.

He was a deputy in the Supreme Council (predecessor to the National Assembly) of the Republic of Armenia from 1991 until his death 1995.

=== Publications ===
Ishkhanyan's works are generally dedicated to the earliest history of the Armenian people, to the comparative linguistic analysis of ancient languages, and to printing. He was one of the authors of the Armenian Soviet Encyclopedia.

Ishkhanyan held the view that Armenians "were the aborigines of the Armenian plateau who have been living there continuously since the fourth millennium B.C.E at the latest". He frequently wrote in favor of the restoration of Classical Armenian orthography.

With the emergence of the Karabakh movement and the independence movement in Armenia, Ishkhanyan also wrote about Armenian-Turkish relations, developing the concept of "the law of excluding the third force" (which was the title of his book published in 1991), which posits that Armenians should not look to a "third force" (i.e., Russia or the West) in order to achieve their national goals and should independently establish relations with their neighbors.

== Personal life ==
Ishkhanyan was married to Byurakn Cheraz-Andreasyan, daughter of prominent Armenian athlete Vahan Cheraz. His son, Avetik Ishkhanian, was a lawyer who headed the Helsinki Committee of Armenia and a former member of the Karabakh Committee.

== Books ==
- Errord Uzhi Batsarman Orenke: Hodvatsner, Azat khosk, ISBN 5-8079-0250-5 (5-8079-0250-5)
- Girke Khorhrdayin Hayastanum: Matenagitakan Tsank, Hayastani azgayin grapalat, ISBN 99930-50-03-2 (99930-50-03-2)
- Mer Inknutyan Glkhavor Nshane: (Grakanagitakan Hetazotutyunner), Nairi, ISBN 5-550-00429-1 (5-550-00429-1)
- Patkerazard Patmutyun Hayots, Book 1, 1989, Arevik, ISBN 5-8077-0057-0 (5-8077-0057-0)
- Rafael Ishkhanian, Hayeri tzagume yev hnaguin patmutiune (The Origins and Most Ancient. History of the Armenians) (Beirut: Altapress 1984))
- Questions of origin and earliest history of Armenian people, Yerevan 1988
- On the Origin and Earliest History of the Armenian People, trans. N. Ouzounian, Montreal, 1989
- Ksiazka Ormianska W Latach 1512 - 1920, Ossolineum, ISBN 8304041782
