= Güepsa =

Guepsa Güepsa
- Municipality and town
- Flag
- Motto: cradle of illustrious men
- Location of the municipality and town of Guepsa in the Santander Department of Colombia.
- Coordinates: 6°01′N 73°34′W
- Country: Colombia
- Department: Santander Department
- Elevation: 1,540 m (5,050 ft)
- Time zone: UTC-5 (Colombia Standard Time)
- Website: www.guepsa-santander.gov.co

Guepsa is a town and municipality in the Santander Department in northeastern Colombia.
