= La Paz, Santander =

La Paz
- Municipality and town
- Flag

- Location of the municipality and town of La Paz in the Santander Department of Colombia.
- Coordinates: 6°10′41″N 73°35′22″W
- Country: Colombia
- Department: Santander Department

Area
  - Total: 270 km^{2} (100 sq mi)
- Elevation: 1,934 m (6,345 ft)

Population
  - Total: 5,442
- Time zone: UTC-5 (Colombia Standard Time)
- Website: http://www.lapaz-santander.gov.co

La Paz is a town and municipality in the Santander Department in northeastern Colombia.
