= Avetik Ishkhanian =

Armenian human rights activist (1955–2025)

- Ավետիք Իշխանյան
- Born: Avetik Rafayel Ishkhanian; 25 February 1955; Yerevan, Armenian SSR, USSR
- Died: 16 February 2025 (aged 69)
- Education: Yerevan State University
- Occupations: Geologist; Activist

Avetik Rafayel Ishkhanian (Armenian: Ավետիք Ռաֆայելի Իշխանյան; 25 February 1955 – 16 February 2025) was an Armenian human rights activist.

== Biography ==
Born in Yerevan on 25 February 1955, Ishkhanian was the son of Rafayel Ishkhanian and his maternal grandfather was Vahan Cheraz. In 1977, he graduated from Yerevan State University with a degree in geophysics. After years of geological research in mines, he studied and defended a thesis at the All-Union Scientific Research Geological Institute in 1987.

Ishkhanian campaigned for the defense of the Armenian language, creating an organization called Machtots. In 1996, he was a co-founder of the Armenian Helsinki Committee, which visited prisons, trained NGOs, and sent observers to courts and polling stations. He often appeared in the Armenian media to discuss human rights and foreign policy.

Avetik Ishkanian died on 16 February 2025, at the age of 69.
