= Bucaramanga =

Capital city of Santander, Colombia

- Municipality and city
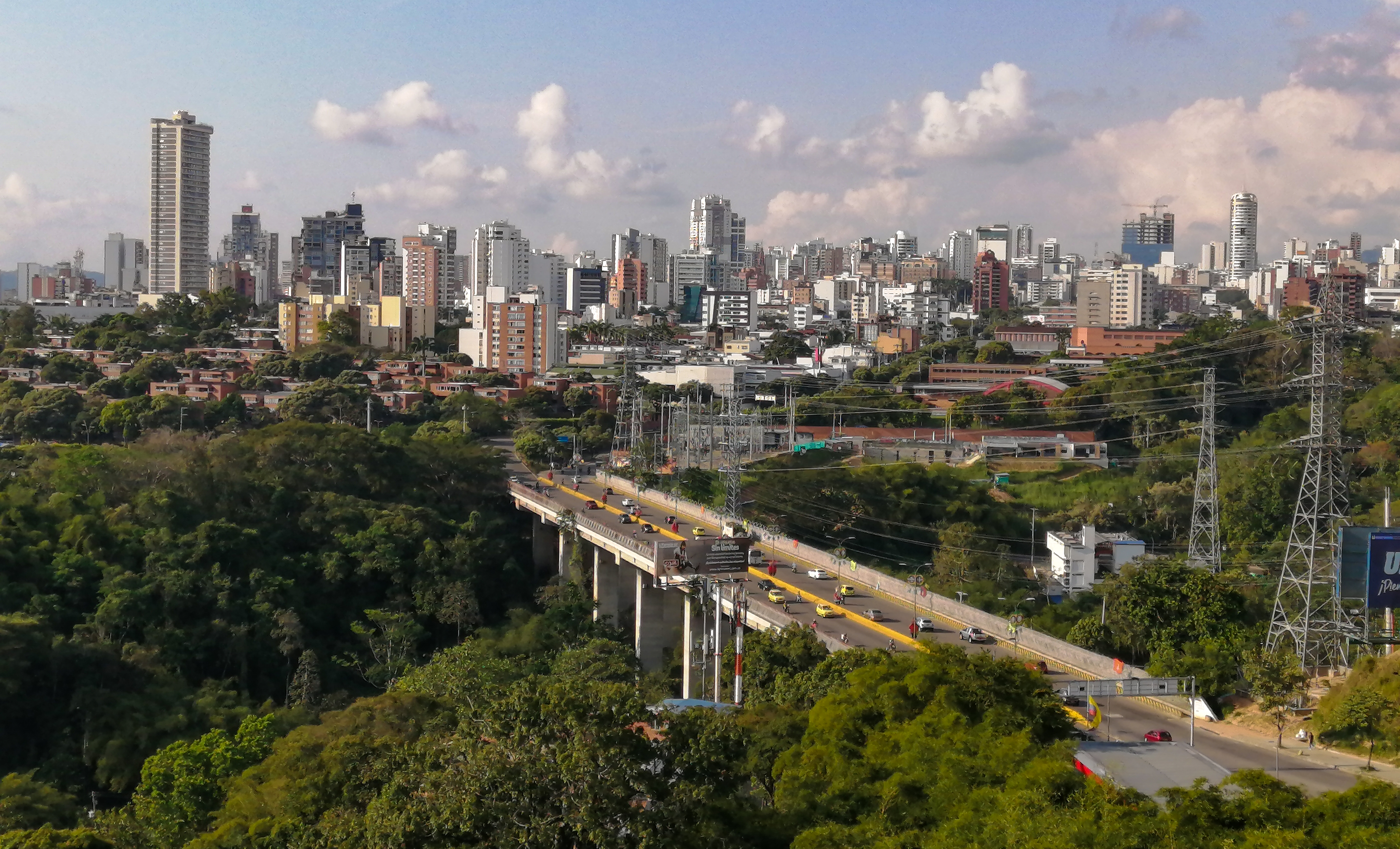
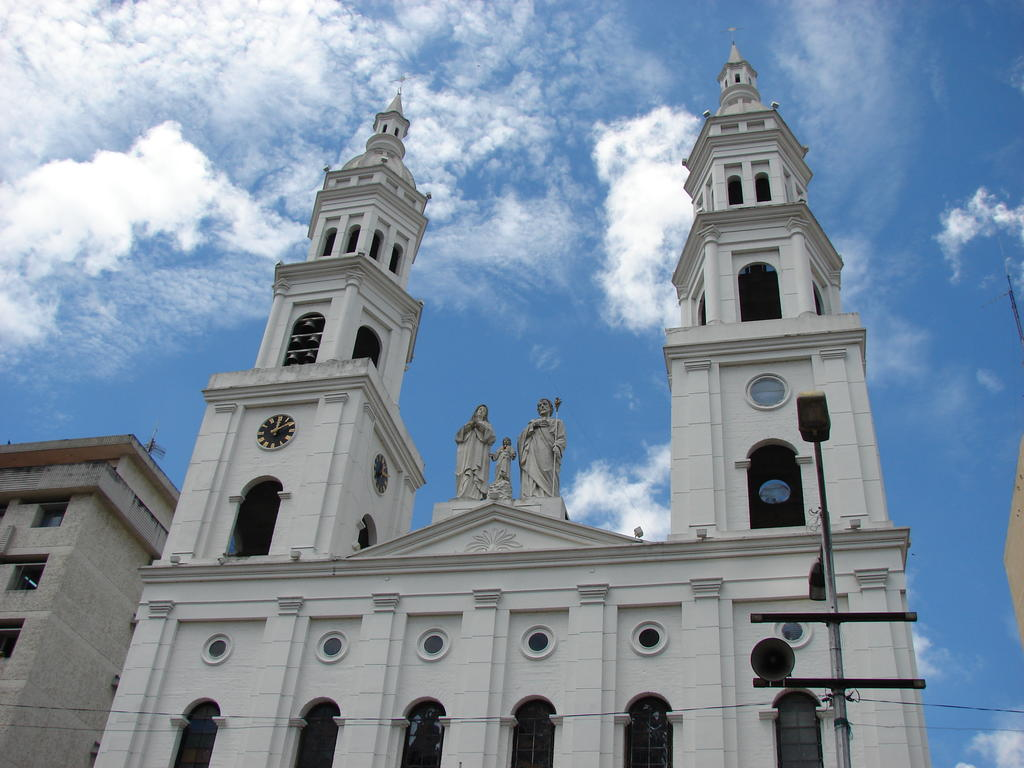
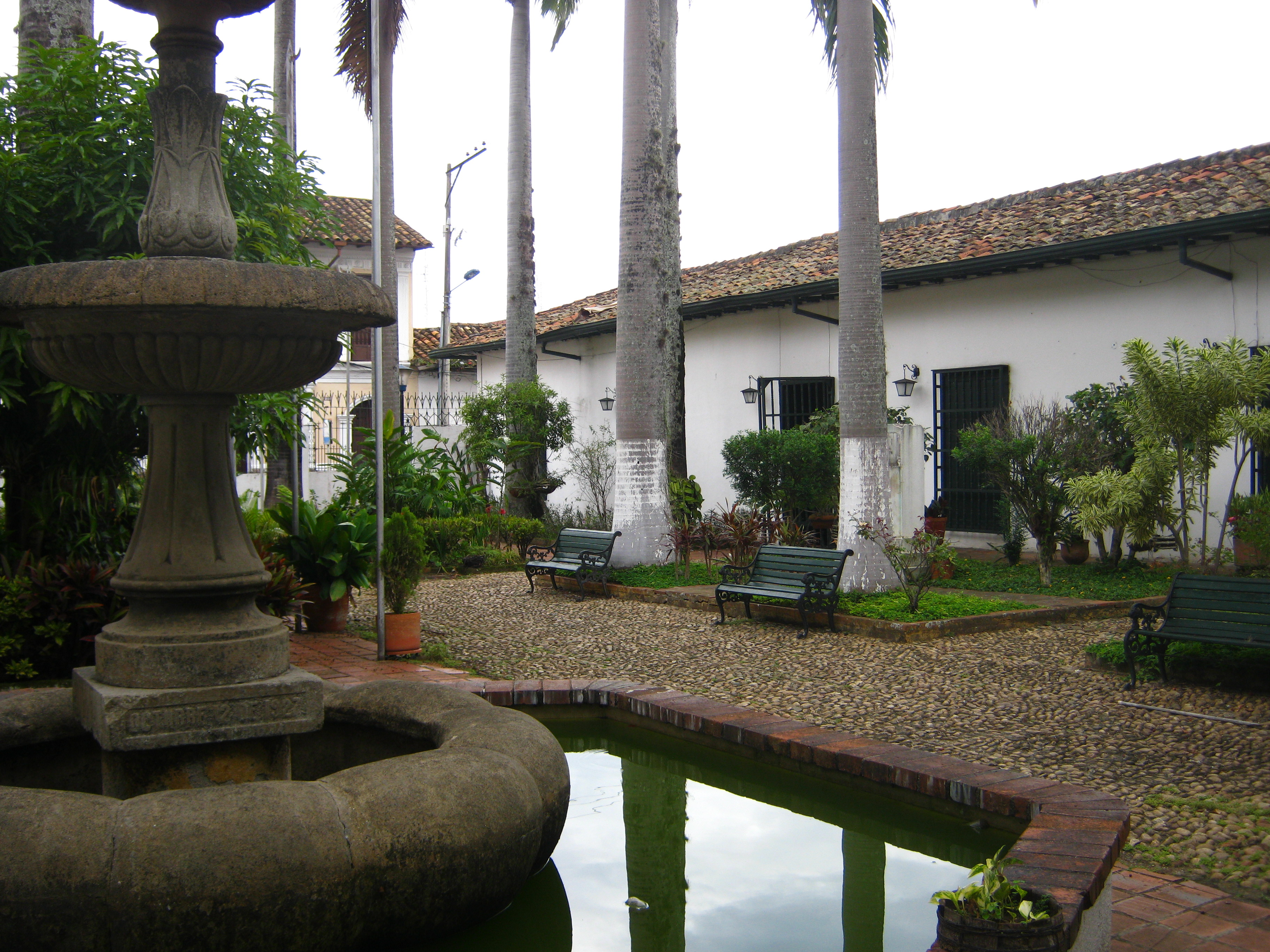
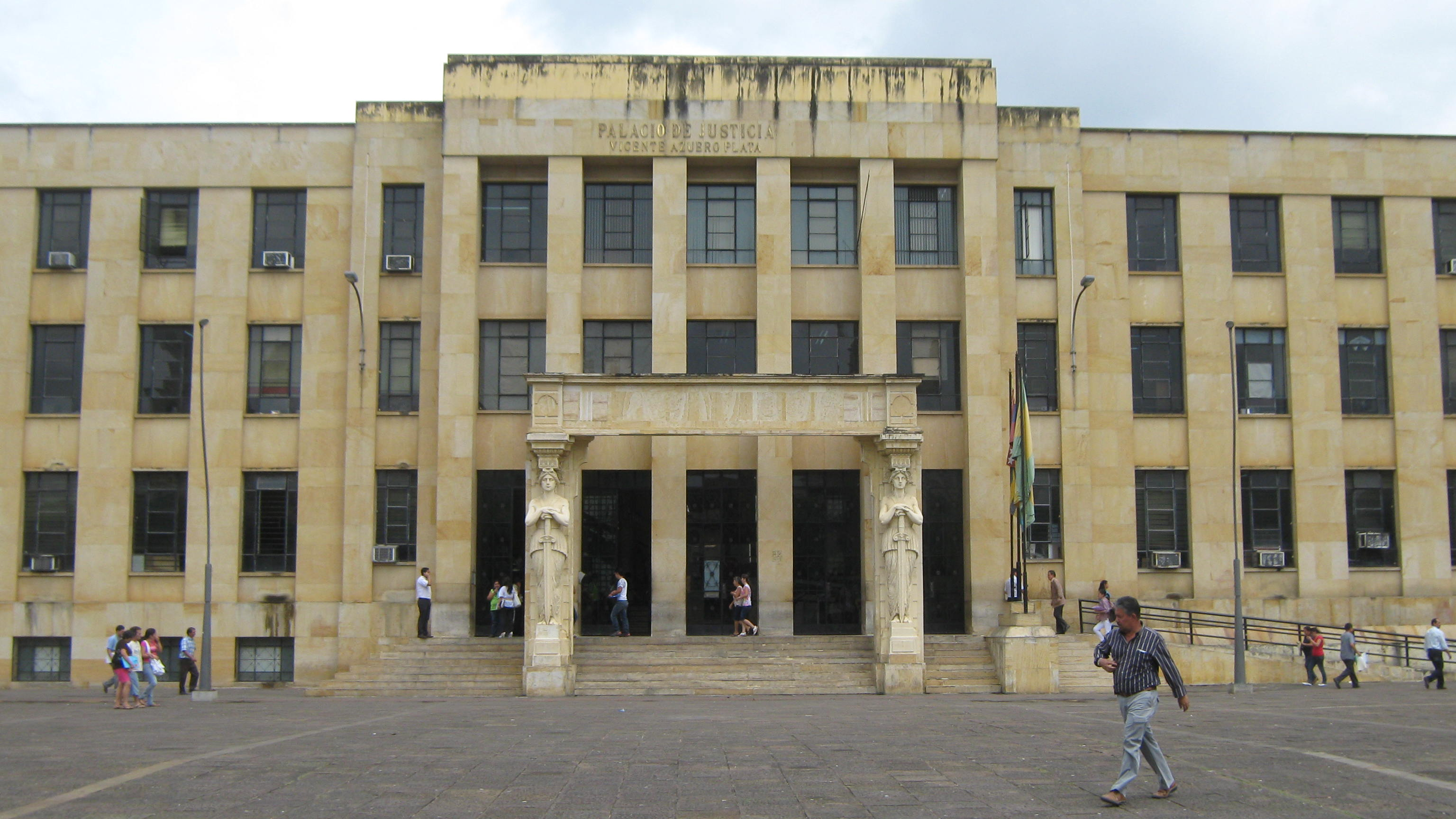
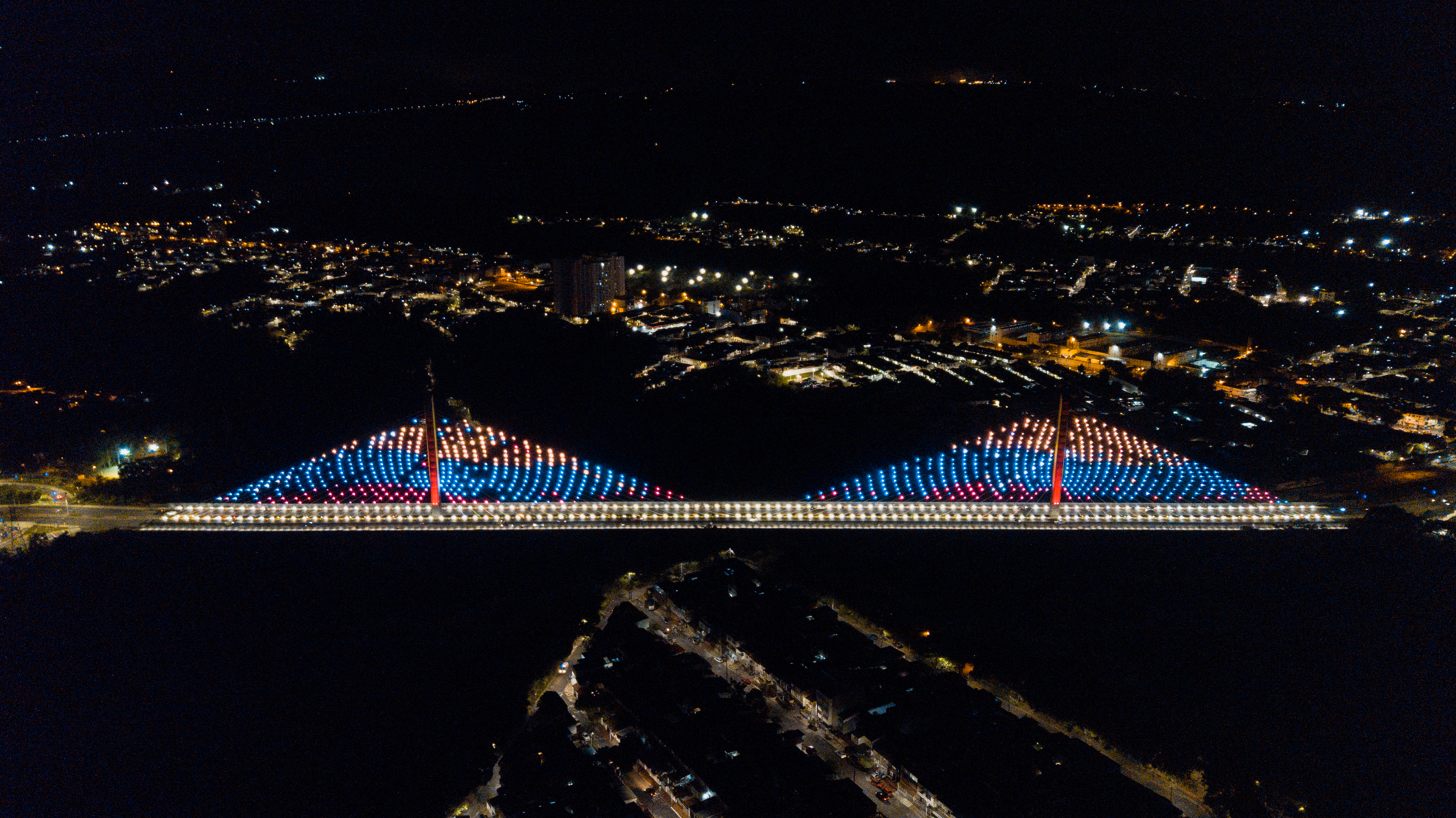
- Bucaramanga skyline Metropolitan Cathedral of the Holy Family Casa de Bolívar Palace of Justice Viaducto Provincial

- Flag Coat of arms
- Nicknames: La ciudad bonita (The Pretty City); La ciudad de los parques (The City of Parks)
- Motto: Montani semper liberi
- Location of the city and municipality of Bucaramanga in the Santander Department

- Location in Colombia
- Coordinates: 7°8′N 73°0′W
- Country: Colombia
- Region: Andean Region
- Department: Santander
- Foundation: 22 December 1622

Government
  - Mayor: Jaime Andrés Beltrán (Movimiento 'Ciudadanos Libres')

Area
  - Municipality and city: 152.9 km^{2} (59.0 sq mi)
  - City: 55.31 km^{2} (21.36 sq mi)
- Elevation: 959 m (3,146 ft)

Population (2020 estimate)
  - Municipality and city: 607,428
  - Rank: 10th in Colombia
  - Density: 3,973/km^{2} (10,290/sq mi)
  - Urban: 893,040
  - Metro: 1,304,288
  - City: 597,316
- Demonym: Bumangués

GDP (Nominal, 2026)
  - Year: 2024
  - Total: $21.68 billion
  - Per capita: $17,709
- Time zone: UTC-05 (Eastern Time Zone)
- Postal code: 680001-680011
- Area code: 57 + 7
- Website: Official website (in Spanish)

Bucaramanga (Spanish pronunciation: [bukaɾaˈmaŋɡa]) is the capital and largest city of the department of Santander, Colombia. Bucaramanga has the fifth-largest economy by GDP in Colombia, has the lowest unemployment rate and is the ninth most populous city in the country, with a population of 613,400 (2023 projection). Bucaramanga has over 160 parks scattered throughout the city and has been given the nickname "La Ciudad de Los Parques" ("The City of Parks") and "La Ciudad Bonita de Colombia" ("Colombia's Beautiful City").

Bucaramanga has grown rapidly since the 1960s, mostly into neighbouring locations within the metropolitan area. Floridablanca, Girón and Piedecuesta are inextricably linked geographically and commercially with Bucaramanga, and now all form together the Bucaramanga Metropolitan Area with a population of 1,304,288, Being one of the largest in Colombia, only surpassed by Bogotá, Medellín, Cali, Barranquilla and Cartagena.

The city is the base of the Colombian Petroleum Institute (ICP), the research branch of the state oil company Ecopetrol.

== History ==
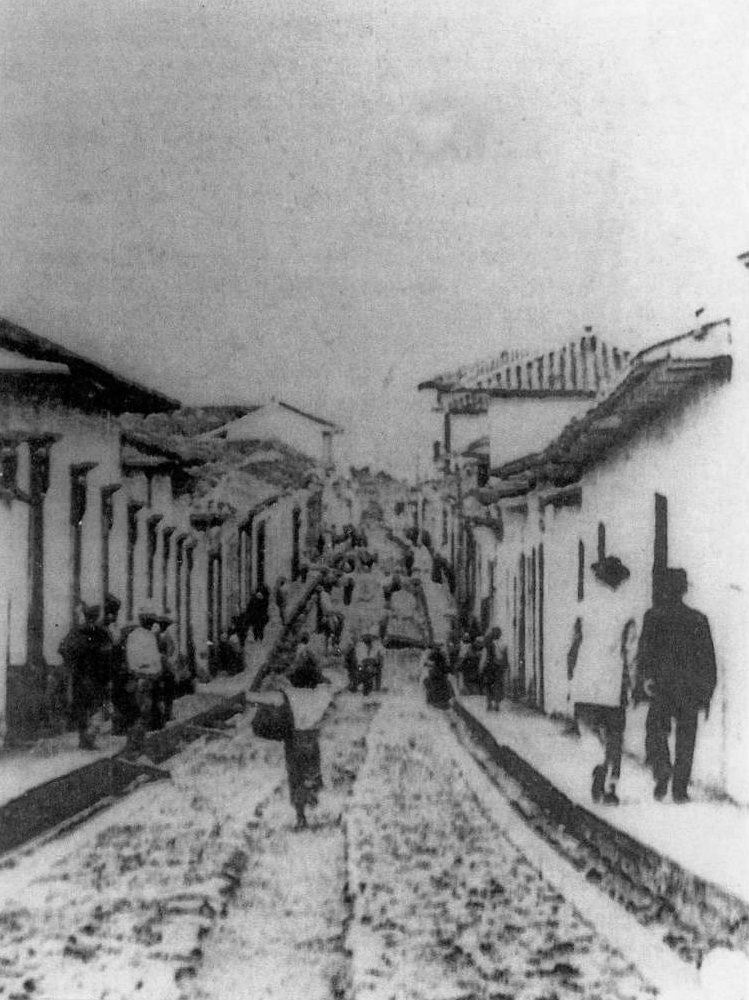
Bucaramanga in 1851

Girón was the first and most significant town founded by Spanish colonialists in the region, and Bucaramanga (founded on 22 December 1622) did not overtake Girón in population or economic significance until the early 19th century. Bucaramanga was born as an indigenous town since the economic activity that occurred for the first time in the area was the extraction of gold from the alluvial deposits that predominated in the region, mainly due to what is known as the La Rosita ravine. Until 1778, Bucaramanga was considered an indigenous town and it was in 1779 when it began to be called a Parish. The name it took was the Parish of Our Lady of Chiquinquira and San Laureano de la Real de Minas de Bucaramanga. The city attracted a core of German merchants and adventurers in the 1860s and 1870s (the most famous of whom was Geo von Lengerke) and tensions between the newcomers and local merchants flared in 1879, when the event named "La Culebra Pico de Oro" ("The Gold Beak Snake") occurred. With the political reorganization of 1886, Bucaramanga replaced Socorro as the departmental capital. The region (although not the city itself) was devastated by the civil war of 1899–1902—commonly known as the Thousand Days War—causing Bucaramanga to grow only modestly in the first half of the 20th century.

== Climate ==
Bucaramanga is located on a plateau in the Cordillera Oriental of the Colombian Andes, and many residents occupy unstable lands descending steeply from the meseta. Westbound of it, the Rio de Oro Canyon is located at an altitude of 600 metres (2,000 ft) above sea level. Eastbound, the Andean Range rises up in high peaks, reaching almost 3,700 metres (12,100 ft) AMSL in the place locally known as "Paramo de Berlin". The city is located at 7°08′N 73°08′W. The official metropolitan area includes the municipalities of: Girón, Piedecuesta and Floridablanca, but Lebrija is home to Bucaramanga's airport and is commonly considered part of greater Bucaramanga. Despite recent urbanization, all four neighboring municipalities contain extensive rural areas.

Under the Köppen climate classification, Bucaramanga features a tropical rainforest climate (Af in Köppen climate classification), though a noticeably cool version of the climate. The city is slightly too dry for a tropical rainforest climate, as its driest month of December averages just under 67 mm (3 in) of rainfall. Although its altitude is not considered very high, Bucaramanga's climate is neither hot nor cold, 22 degrees Celsius being the average temperature. Compared to cities at the same average altitude (such as Cali), Bucaramanga has much cooler daytime temperatures, owing to the cold wind coming down the eastern peaks; its night temperatures are not cold, owing to the warm air coming from the canyon. These phenomena make the daily thermal oscillation narrower than in other Colombian cities.

Climate data for Bucaramanga (Industrial University of Santander), elevation 1,018 m (3,340 ft), (1981–2010)
Month	Jan	Feb	Mar	Apr	May	Jun	Jul	Aug	Sep	Oct	Nov	Dec	Year
Mean daily maximum °C (°F)	28.0 (82.4)	28.1 (82.6)	28.3 (82.9)	28.2 (82.8)	28.5 (83.3)	28.3 (82.9)	28.4 (83.1)	28.7 (83.7)	28.6 (83.5)	28.1 (82.6)	27.6 (81.7)	27.7 (81.9)	28.2 (82.8)
Daily mean °C (°F)	23.1 (73.6)	23.3 (73.9)	23.4 (74.1)	23.3 (73.9)	23.2 (73.8)	23.2 (73.8)	23.1 (73.6)	23.2 (73.8)	23.0 (73.4)	22.6 (72.7)	22.6 (72.7)	22.8 (73.0)	23.1 (73.6)
Mean daily minimum °C (°F)	19.0 (66.2)	19.3 (66.7)	19.4 (66.9)	19.7 (67.5)	19.6 (67.3)	19.6 (67.3)	19.2 (66.6)	19.4 (66.9)	19.2 (66.6)	19.1 (66.4)	19.3 (66.7)	19.2 (66.6)	19.3 (66.7)
Average precipitation mm (inches)	91.2 (3.59)	91.3 (3.59)	137.1 (5.40)	120.6 (4.75)	139.7 (5.50)	90.7 (3.57)	111.7 (4.40)	81.7 (3.22)	117.8 (4.64)	123.9 (4.88)	104.1 (4.10)	66.6 (2.62)	1,270 (50.00)
Average precipitation days	10	11	14	17	17	17	18	19	18	18	13	9	180
Average relative humidity (%)	82	81	82	84	85	84	83	83	83	85	86	84	83
Mean monthly sunshine hours	182.9	121.4	102.3	108.0	114.7	90.0	117.8	117.8	108.0	108.5	132.0	164.3	1,467.7
Mean daily sunshine hours	5.9	4.3	3.3	3.6	3.7	3.0	3.8	3.8	3.6	3.5	4.4	5.3	4.0
Source: Instituto de Hidrologia Meteorologia y Estudios Ambientales

== Municipal flag ==
The municipal flag of Bucaramanga was designed by the historian Gustavo Gómez Mejía. Made of two green stripes with a yellow one in the middle. In the center, there's a blue disk, surrounded by a red circle. In the middle of the blue disk, there's a white star. In the red circle the following legend: "Below the azure of its sky and defended by the generous blood of its sons, Bucaramanga is opened to the four horizons of the motherland" is written.

== Municipal coat of arms ==
The words Montani Semper Liberi are Latin for "Mountaineers are Always Free". This is also used as the official motto for the U.S. State of West Virginia.

== Demography ==
According to the data obtained from the 2018 census and information provided by the Metropolitan Area of Bucaramanga, the city has an estimated population of 681,130 inhabitants.

Of the total population, 47.5% are men and 52.5% women. The average number of occupants per household is 3.6 people. 16.6% of people of the population are 10 years of age or younger. Of all cohabiting couples in the city, 46.3% were single, 26.7% were married, 5.8% were separated and 4.6% were widowed. 9.2% of the resident population aged over 4 years are from another municipality, and 0.3% from another country.

In the city, 39% of people live in houses, while 56.7% live in apartments and 4.3% in a leased room or other.

== Economy ==
=== Industry ===
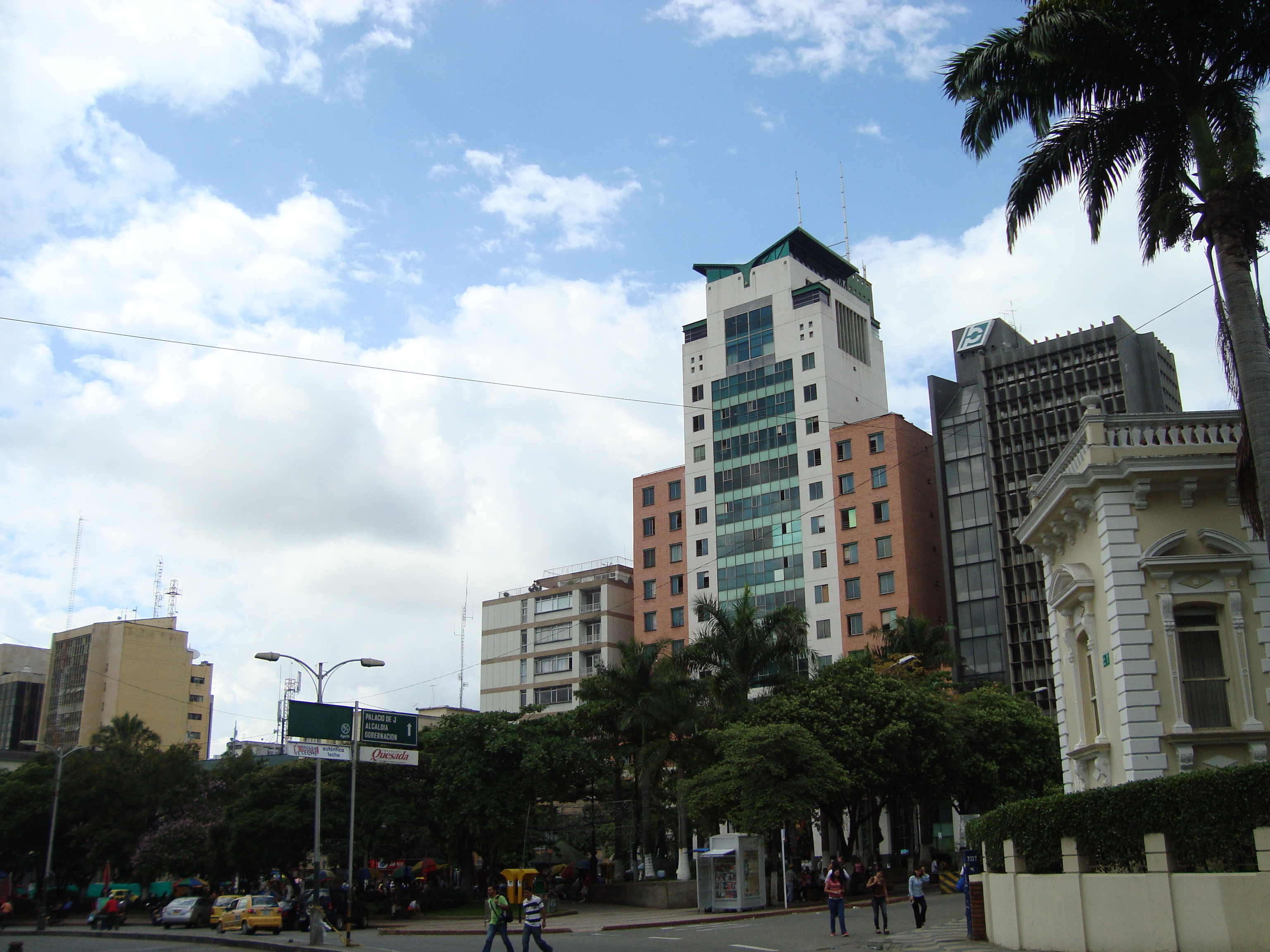
Downtown Bucaramanga, Santander Park, and the Triad building

An industrial activity developed in Bucaramanga that has gained national recognition is the footwear industry. For this reason, the Footwear Manufacturers' Association (Asoinducals) is located in the city. The footwear sector has a major market nationally and internationally in countries such as Argentina, Brazil, Canada, Ecuador, Italy, some Caribbean islands, United States, Peru, Venezuela and Mexico.

There is also a big clothing industry. There are a growing number of technological research centers in various topics such as energy, gas, oil, corrosion, asphalt, leather and agro-industrial development tools, among others.

The Chimitá Industrial Zone is located in the western area of the plateau near the town of Girón; many companies from different specialties like Terpel have production plants there. Also in the city is one of the main production plants of Cervecería Bavaria S.A. (Bavaria Brewery). The city is planning to build the Zona Franca de Santander, a customs-free zone located within the metropolitan area of Bucaramanga.

Bucaramanga has positioned itself as a city of congresses and events, having infrastructures like Fair and Exhibition Centre - CENFER, many fairs, and exhibitions in all branches of the national economic sectors are performed there annually.

The city also has a polyfunctional center for events and shows, which gives a space for performing great shows, puzzle games, sports, and business. A number of meeting rooms and conferences allow Bucaramanga to hold conventions for entrepreneurs around the country.

The trade fairs, as well as direct benefits to the respective sector, have benefits in other areas of the economy such as transport, hotels, restaurants, shops and various services activities such as advertising, design and decoration, modeling, etc.

The International Exhibition of Children's Fashion (EIMI) takes place in Bucaramanga. It is the only exhibition specialized in children's clothing in Latin America. The event is organized in the CENFER complex and 40% of the sales generated come from exported products.

=== Business ===
In recent years, several major shopping centers and commercial buildings have been built in Bucaramanga. An example is the shopping center La Florida, a six-storey mall with two pedestrian bridges and one vehicular bridge. A newer shopping center, Megamall, was built in 2007.

In the following years, three more shopping centers were built in other areas of the city: Cacique, Parque Caracolí, and De la Cuesta. Another shopping district known as "Cabecera del Llano" includes five major shopping centers: Cabecera Etapa I, Etapa II and Etapa III, as well as the more recognized Cabecera Etapa IV and the shopping center "La Quinta" or V Etapa.

The Acropolis Shopping Center is located in an area known as Ciudadela Real de Minas, while the San Andresito commercial center and the traditional and renovated (2005) Cañaveral shopping center are located in the southern sector of the city along with the El Cacique shopping center, opened in November 2012 and considered one of the largest in Latin America.

One of the largest hypermarket chains in Colombia, Exito, has five stores throughout the city and a distribution center for eastern Colombia.

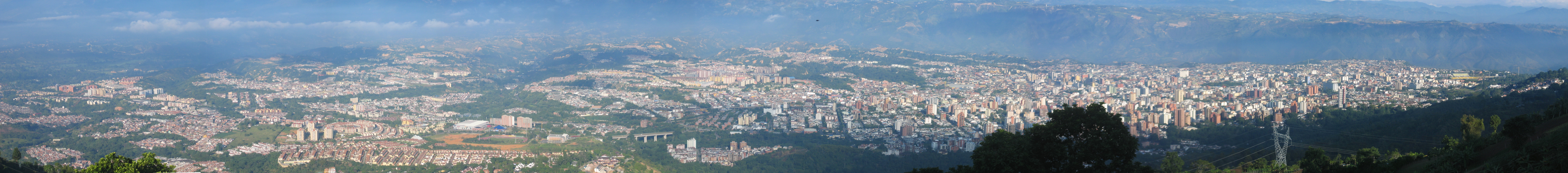
View of the city of Bucaramanga in 2006

=== Labor market ===
Historically, Bucaramanga has had one of the lowest rates of unemployment among Colombian cities. As of September 2010, according to DANE statistics between July and September 2010, the city had an unemployment rate of 11.8%, increasing by 3.3% compared to October and December 2009 which showed a rate of 8.5%.

==== Transport ====
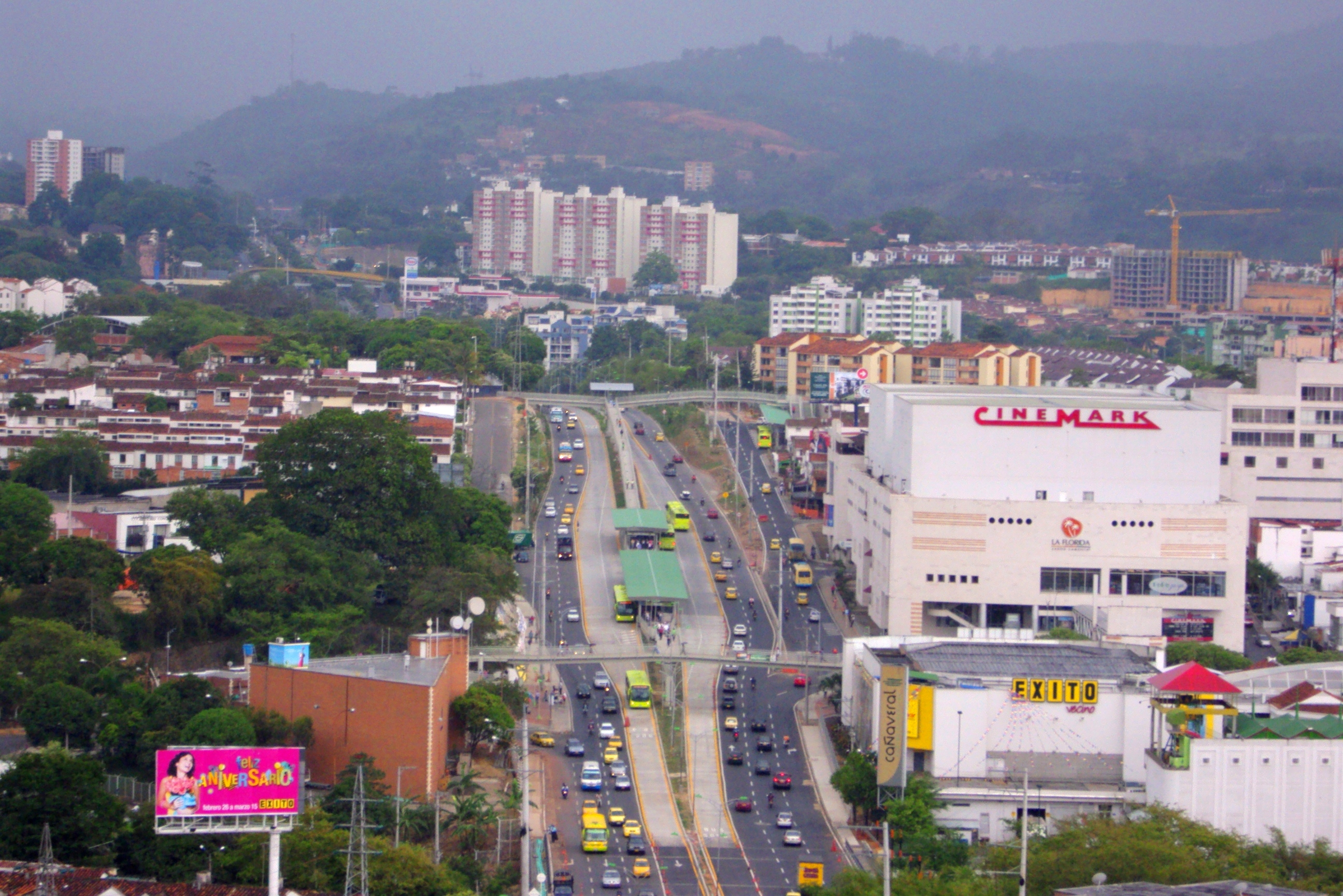
Trunk Highway Metrolínea in Bucaramanga - Floridablanca and Canaveral station

Metrolínea is the Integrated Mass Transit System of Bucaramanga. Its construction began in 2006 during the administration of Mayor Honorio Galvis; its operation is currently in its first phase, which began on 22 December 2009. The six lines inaugurated in this phase are: Avenida del Libertador (Diagonal 15), autocentral, Prospero Pinzon Avenue (27th Avenue), La Cumbre, Highway Floridablanca Villabel Bucarica and which have 91 stopways. The administration is currently in the process of coupling the second phase, which will cover the areas of Piedecuesta, Ciudadela Real de Minas, the Avenue of the Americas (Race 33) and will have trunks at Autosur, Real de Minas and the Americas.

==== National road connection ====
Bucaramanga is connected to the mainland by two main routes. The first is the National Route 66 which comes from Barrancabermeja and Cucuta communicates with and then into Venezuela, the second the Ruta Nacional 45A that comes from Bogotá and San Alberto comes up this road connects with the Colombian Caribbean region and major cities across the Ruta Nacional 45.

=== Air transport ===
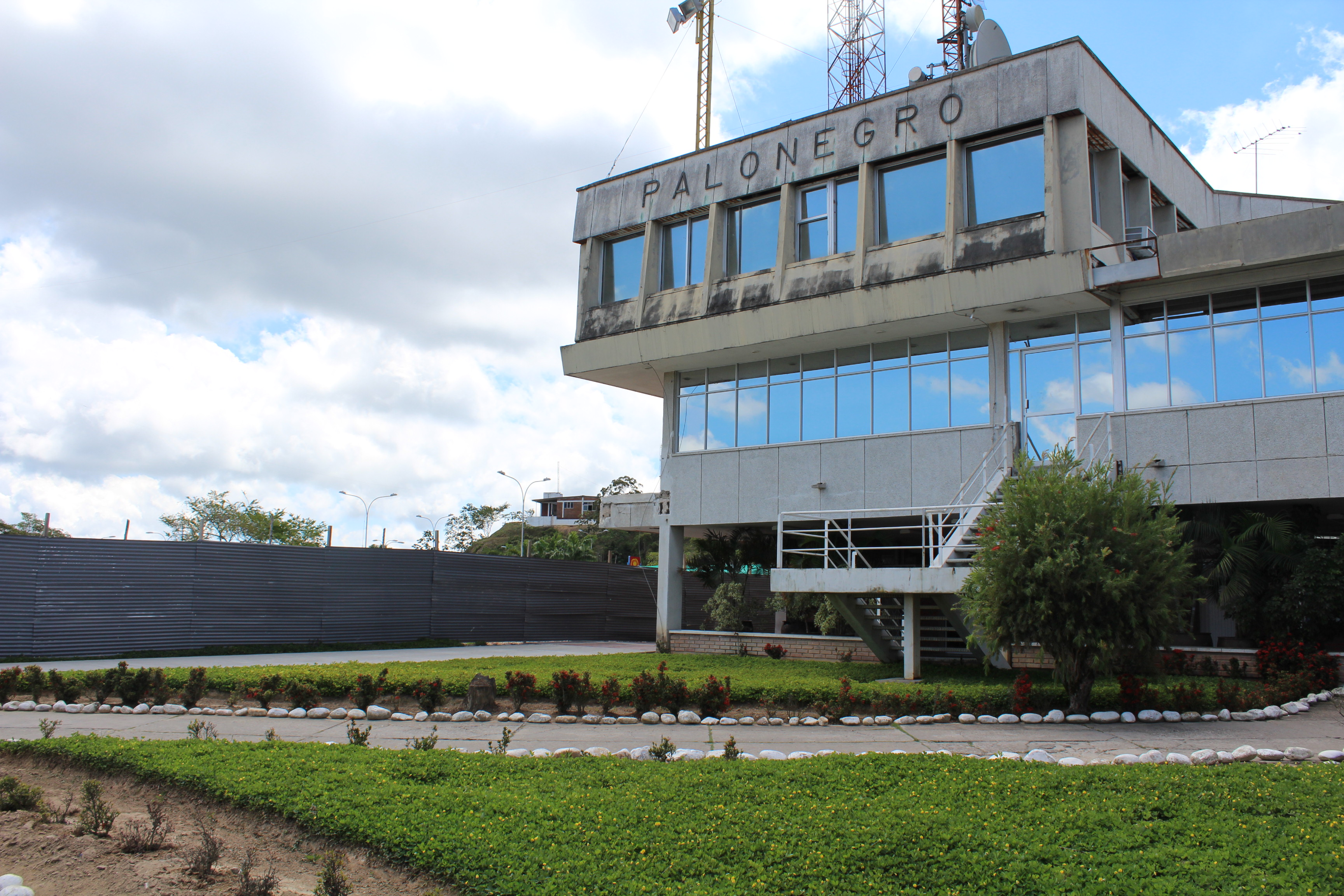
Bucaramanga Palonegro Airport.

The international airport serving Bucaramanga is Palonegro International Airport, located on the hill of Palonegro, west of the metropolitan area and close to the town of Lebrija.

The airport opened in 1974, replacing the old airport Gómez Niño located in the Ciudadela Real de Minas. The airport currently operates under the administration of the Palonegro consortium Colombo-Korean SAS East Airports Group. There are daily flights from most major cities in Colombia, as well as international flights from the city of Panama.

In 2009, Palonegro International Airport was ranked among Colombia's most important airports.

== People ==
Many important Colombian people are from Bucaramanga, such as Luis Carlos Galán, presidential candidate murdered in 1989, Carlos Ardila Lülle, one of the most important businessmen in Colombia.

Colombian artist Oscar Rodríguez Naranjo came back from France during the Second World War and settled in Bucaramanga. Rodríguez Naranjo taught at the art school while he made a number of paintings that would build up his reputation in Colombia. In 1941 he became the Director of the Academia de Bellas Artes in Bucaramanga.

== Education ==
The city has a good reputation due to its numerous universities, among them: Industrial University of Santander (Universidad Industrial de Santander)

The Universidad Industrial de Santander is an official institution that offers 95 degrees and a wide range of undergraduate and graduate courses within the health sciences, humanities, sciences, and engineering colleges. Also, it offers seven technological programs in different fields through the Distance Learning Institute. Nowadays, after 71 years of existence, there are nearly 14,000 students registered in undergraduate and graduate programs, as well as a total 22,000 alumni. It proudly stands as the leading higher education institution in the northeastern part of the country and ranks fourth among official universities nationwide. Also, the University has created affiliate branches in Barrancabermeja—home of the most important oil refinery in the country—El Socorro and Málaga. Recently it has extended its services to Barranquilla and Bogotá through the offer of its Graduate Programs.

- Universidad Autónoma de Bucaramanga (UNAB) Autonomous University of Bucaramanga
- Universidad de Santander (UDES)
- Unidades Tecnológicas de Santander (UTS)
- Saint Thomas Aquinas University (Universidad Santo Tomás)
- Pontifical Bolivarian University (Universidad Pontificia Bolivariana)
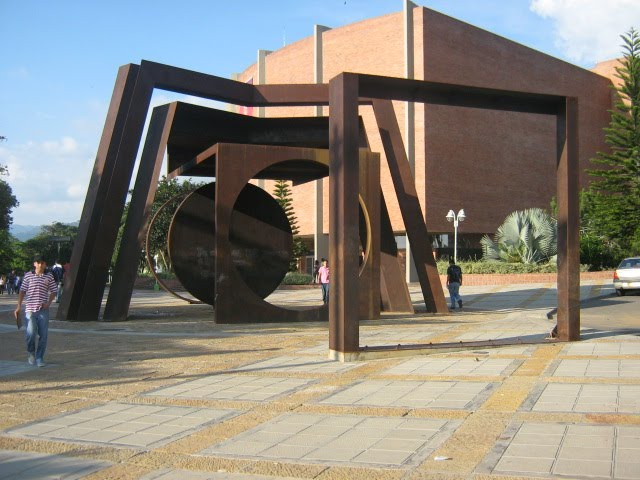
Universidad Industrial de Santander. Geometry Lesson Memorial and Auditorium Luis A. Calvo

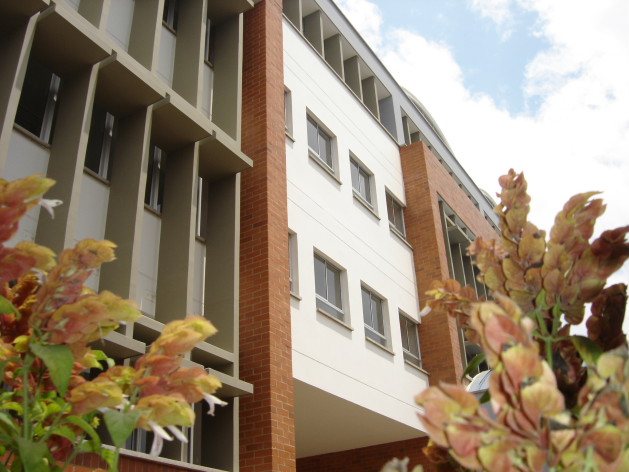
Universidad Industrial de Santander. Faculty of Humanities

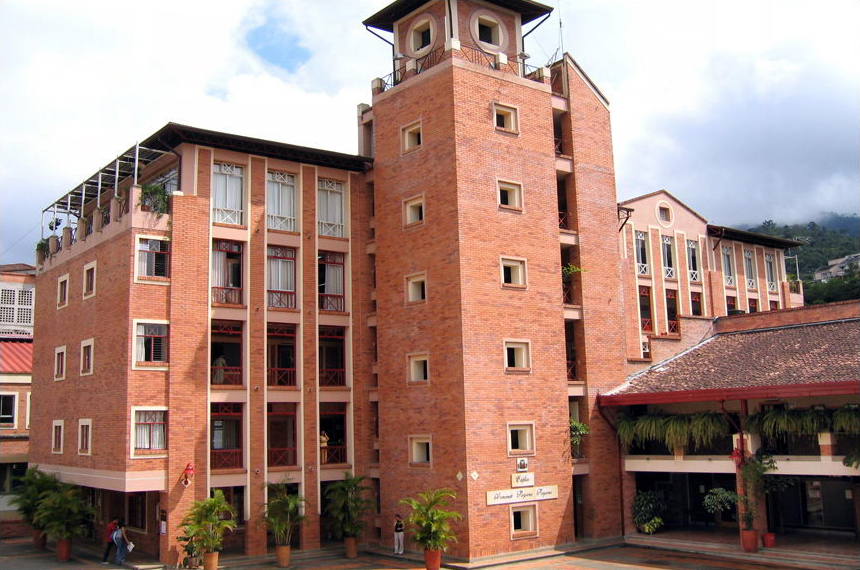
Universidad Autónoma de Bucaramanga, campus El bosque

== Culture ==
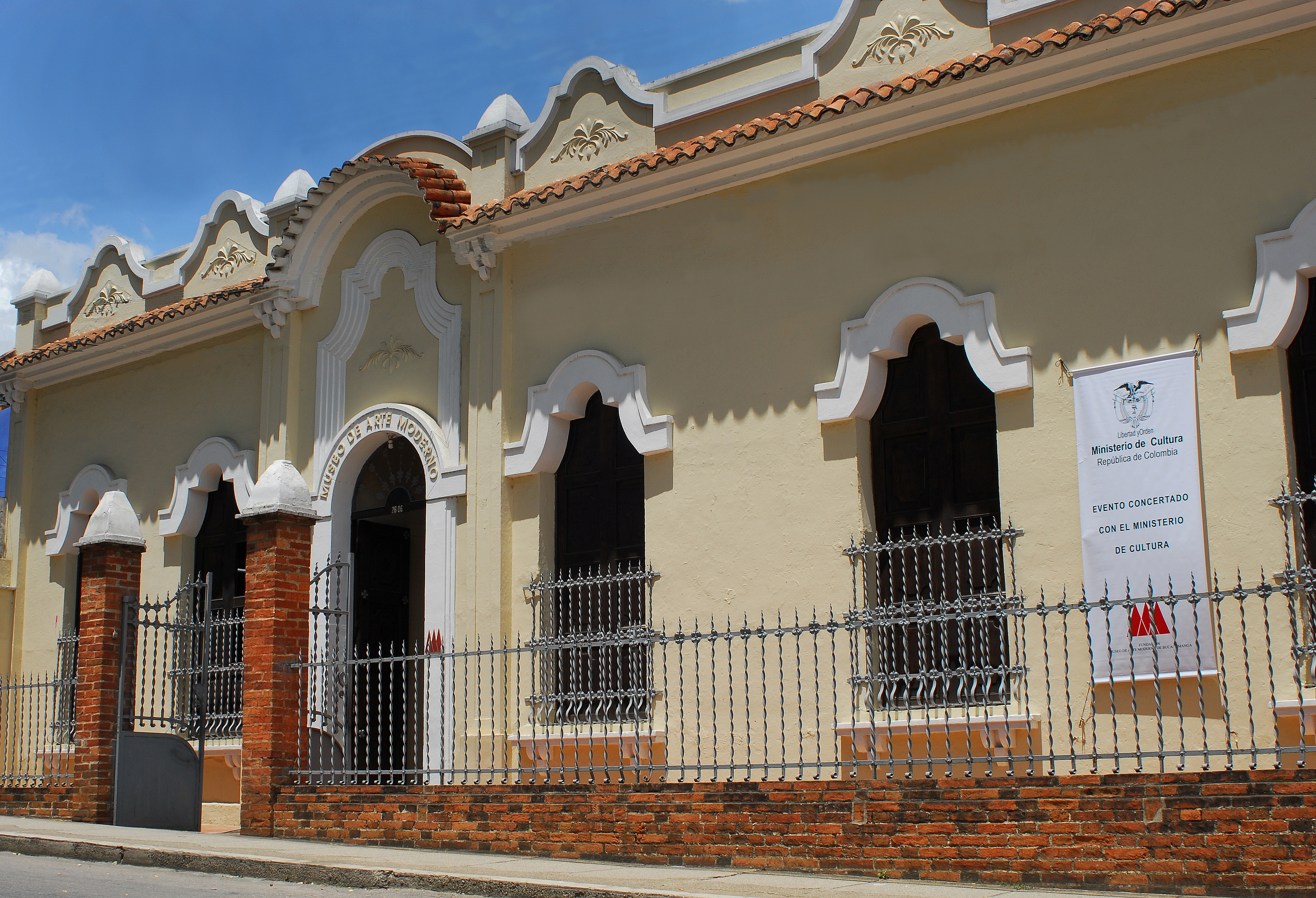
Museum of Modern Art in Bucaramanga

Bucaramanga's culture has several expressions, from the visual arts such as painting, sculpture, photography, and recently also in experimental demonstrations that incorporate new technology for artistic communication, such as video. Throughout Bucaramanga's history, it has hosted many cultural offerings in various areas, causing arts groups to form within the city.

One of the main pillars of culture in Bucaramanga is literature, as in the past there was a local cultural movement that produced a number of writers.

In 1995, the administration of Mayor Luis Fernando Peña Cote decided to convert Gabriel Turbay Public Library to hold the newly created Municipal Institute of Culture, assigning the library building to Gabriel Turbay, who has overseen space management for the institute, which has meant the movement of areas of the library to use the administrative area of the Municipal Institute of Culture. The creation of the Municipal Institute of Culture was conceived in order to expand the possibilities for sponsoring culture in the metropolitan area. But as culture has not traditionally played a leading role in local government, colleges do not receive sufficient funding and incentives to fulfill their purposes.

The Institute provides library services, art workshops, and a variety of shows and cultural work from the different neighborhoods of the city. The city sponsors these cultural activities with private investment. Bucaramanga also features a cultural radio station (Station Cultural Luis Carlos Galán Sarmiento) on 100.7 FM.

=== Gastronomy ===
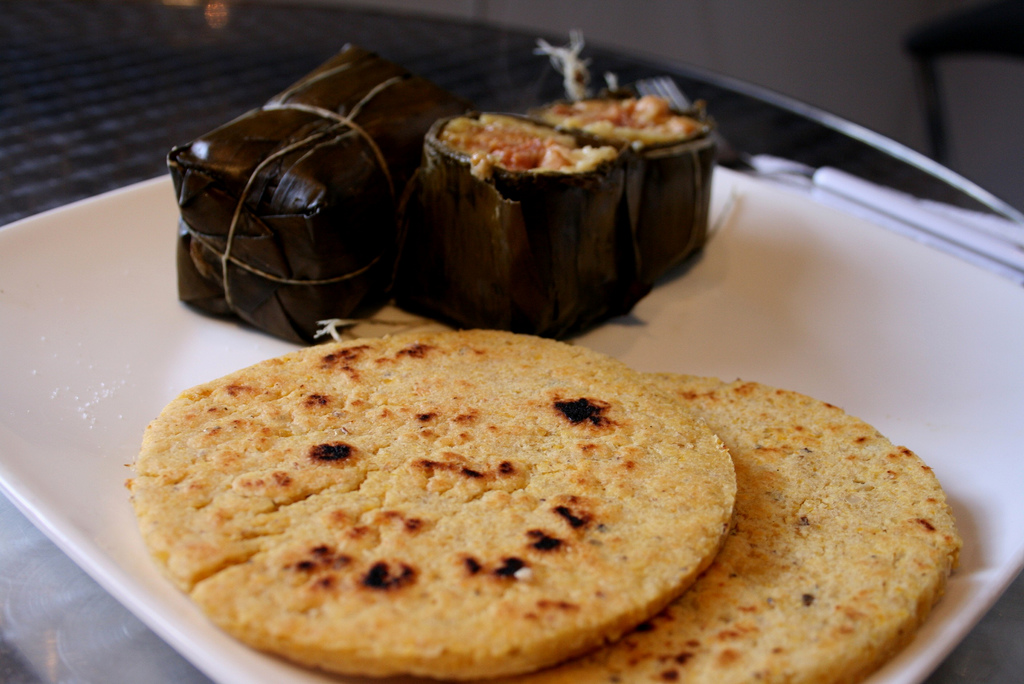
Corn arepa (arepa de maíz pela'o) and tamal are some of the typical dishes of Santander.

Bucaramanga shares a great deal of its gastronomic identity with that of the Santander department. Hence, typical dishes from Bucaramanga include mute santandereano (a soup made from various grains, vegetables, herbs, and meat), pepitoria (a preparation of offal and goat's blood mixed with white rice), arepa de maíz pela'o, and tamales.

The traditional confectionery also reflects the region's culinary heritage. It includes candied products made from creole celery, lemon, rice, and pineapple; as well as gelatina de pata, a gelatin and panela treat made from cattle feet that resembles marshmallows. Other items include bocadillo veleño (a type of guava confection), and sweets made with arequipe such as panuchas and brevas. Floridablanca is particularly renowned for its obleas, a dessert consisting of two large, thin, round wafers filled with sweet spreads.

Perhaps the most distinctive culinary tradition, dating back to pre-Columbian times, is the consumption of hormigas culonas, literally translated as "big-assed ants". This delicacy is only available seasonally, when the virgin queen ants emerge for their nuptial flight during May and June. Their harvesting process remains completely artisanal, providing a source of income for farmers in rural Santander. Once collected, the wings and head are discarded; then, the rest of the body is seasoned with salt water and toasted with minimal oil. They have become a symbol of the region and are considered an export commodity.

In recent years, the city's gastronomic landscape has evolved with its growing openness to international cuisine and has expanded the fast food scene. Bucaramanga has gained notoriety in Colombia for its distinctive use of pineapple and tartar sauces as staple toppings on burgers and hot dogs.

== Religion ==
The church of San Laureano and the Dolores Chapel are located in the colonial downtown area. The Iglesia Metodista de Colombia has a church in Bucaramanga.

== Tourism ==
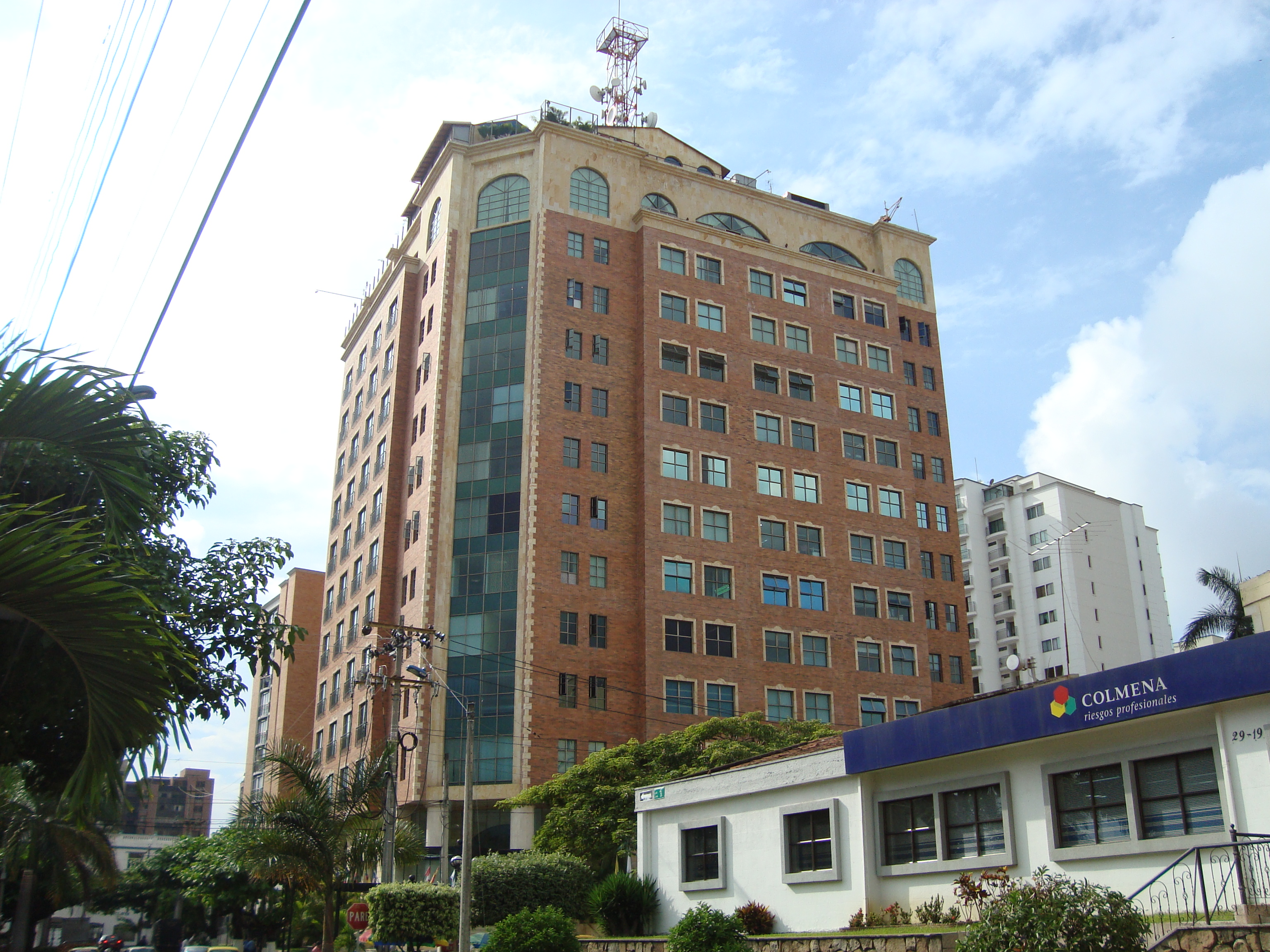
Hotel Dann Carlton.

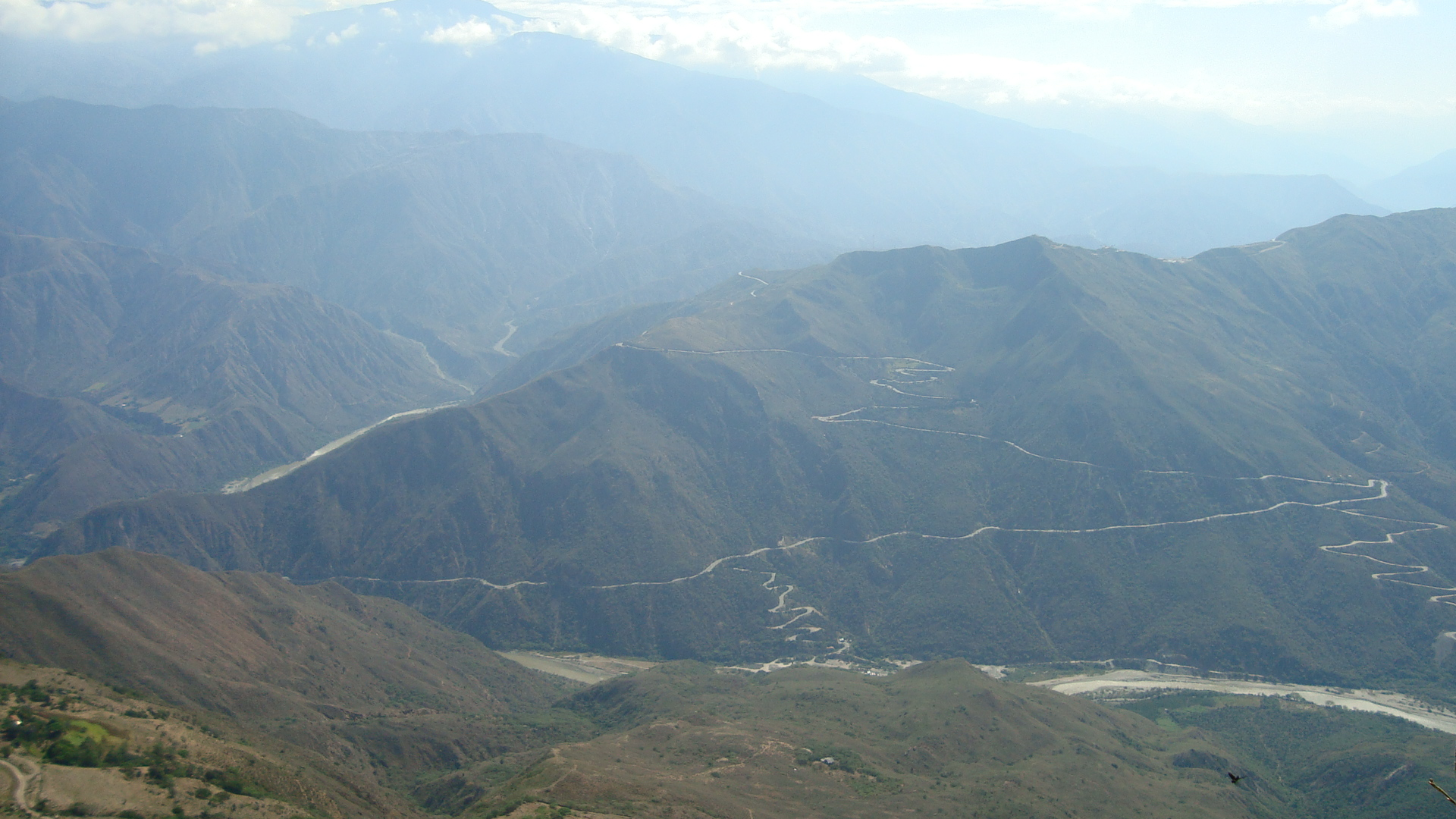
Chicamocha Canyon

Bucaramanga's tourism diversity earned it the title of being one of the seven national pride tourism destinations through a voting process convened by Colombia is Passion and Bavaria.

The city and its neighboring municipalities offer a great variety of touristic experiences that involve nature, recreation and history. Its parks allow for ecotourism, the "Voladero the Águilas" is 15 minutes away and allows paragliding. Likewise, the downtown area preserves some colonial buildings including churches and some widely recognized houses such as the house of Simon Bolivar, and the Louis Peru de Lacroix' house.

The aforementioned attractions are complemented by a sound hotel infrastructure, with the presence of widely recognized chains, and also the availability of restaurants and nightclubs. The latter tend to be clustered in well-known zones such as Cuadra Play .

=== Lookouts ===
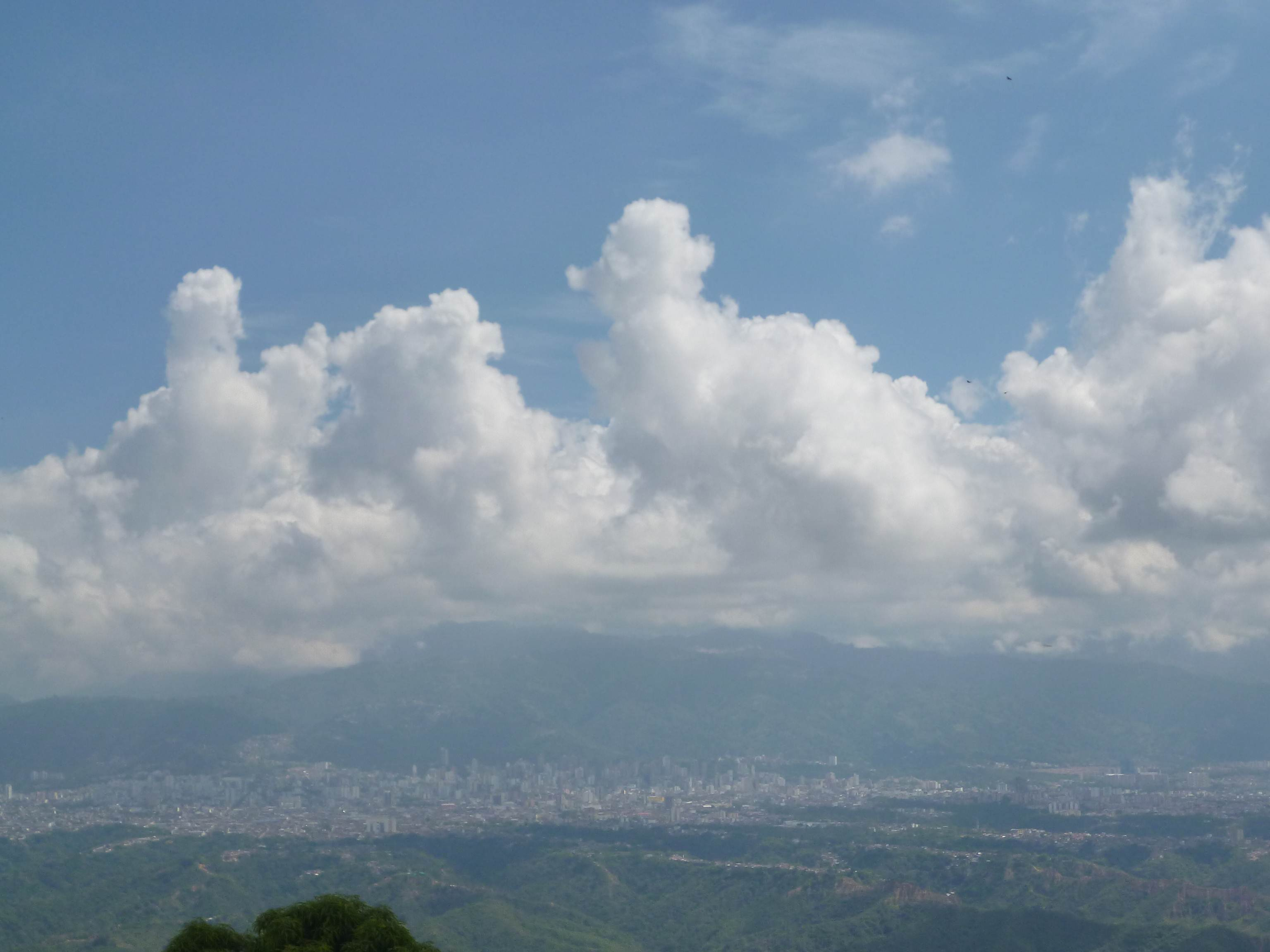
View from the observation deck of Bucaramanga Palonegro, near the airport.

Morrorico: Located east of Bucaramanga, the road to Cucuta, you can see a panorama of the city, here is the statue of Sacred Heart, which is visited at Easter time, and the inhabitants and parishioners sector have the belief that the statue does miracles. Also in this area is planned the construction of a cable car or cable metrocable called to transport the inhabitants of the sector.

Palonegro: It is located on the road that leads to the airport of the same name. It allows for a splendid view of the western side of the metropolitan area of Bucaramanga. It is surrounded by several nightclubs and other establishments that are popular during the weekends.

=== Natural and Historic Attractions ===
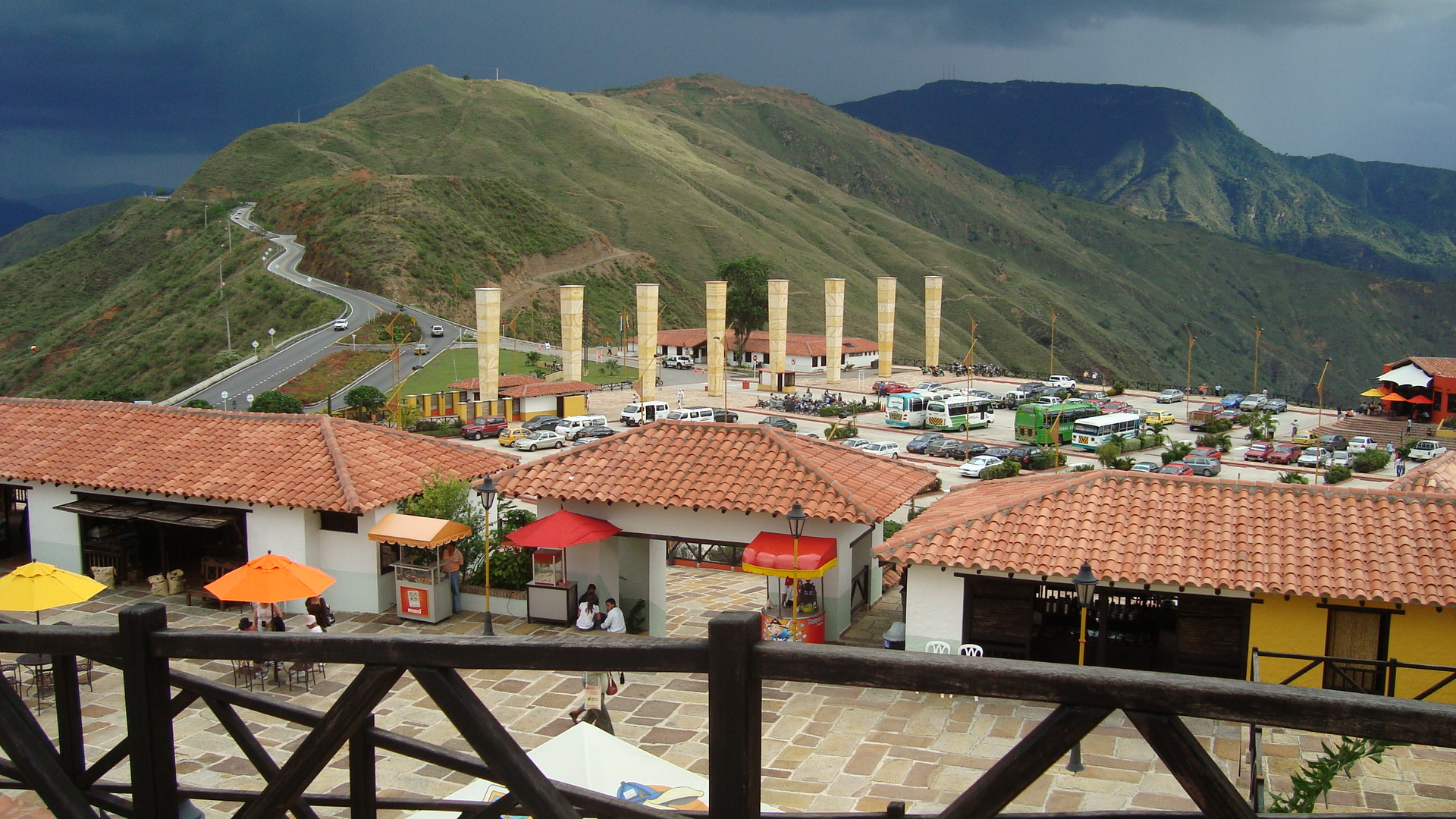
Chicamocha National Park, also known as PANACHI, one of the major attractions of the region.

'Chicamocha National Park' (PANACHI): on the road that leads to Bogotá at the maximum height of the Cordillera Oriental in the municipality of Aratoca, offers an exceptional view of the mighty river canyon Chicamocha, is equally Chicamocha National Park, from where you can appreciate at its best canons of rivers Chicamocha and Suarez.

Giron: Located 9 km of Bucaramanga. Founded in 1631, the gold mines were important during the colonial era of tremendous architectural heritage, which made it a national monument. Stands the Museum of Religious Art, with valuable paintings and ancient liturgical objects, The Basilica of the Lord of Miracles, pilgrimage site, and the Chapel of Corregidor, on the outskirts.

Socorro: Located 121 kilometres (75 miles) from Bucaramanga. Cradle of the uprising of the villagers, is located in the province Comunera, northeastern department of Santander. It was founded in 1681 and 1711 he was awarded the title of "Very Noble and Loyal Villa". In 1781 Manuela Beltrán broke the edict that raised taxes and contributions, which led to the revolt of the Communards. In the main square stand monuments to José Antonio Galán, leader of the uprising, and Antonia Santos. Other attractions are the house of culture and the cathedral.

Barichara: Located 118 km (73 mi) from the city of Bucaramanga, Barichara was founded by the Parra family Pradilla to serve the veneration of the Virgin of the Stone. In May 1975 the town received the title of "Cutest little town in Colombia" and by Resolution 005 of 30 June 1975 was declared a National Monument. Attractions in this village of cobblestone streets and wooden balconies include:

- Guane: colonial population home to a seventeenth-century church, the sanctuary of St. Lucia, and the Archaeological Museum, known for its important collection of marine life fossils and colonial period books.
- San Gil: located 96 kilometres (60 mi) from Bucaramanga. The historic center of the town with steep streets and on the banks of the river Fonce National Monument. One of its main attractions is the park The Gallineral, occupying an island in the river, the moss hanging from the trees and the sound of water make it a must-visit site.

Other attractions are the San Gil Ragonessi ecological park, spa blue well, the Grotto Hill, Cerro de La Cruz and adventure sports like rafting, mountain climbing, mountain biking and motocross, among others.

== Sports ==
Indersantander and Inderbu are the entities responsible for the management and development of local sport in Santander.

=== Football ===
Bucaramanga has the Estadio Alfonso López, with a current capacity of 28,000. This stadium is the home of the local football team Atlético Bucaramanga and was home of Real Santander from 2009 to 2013.

=== Other sports ===
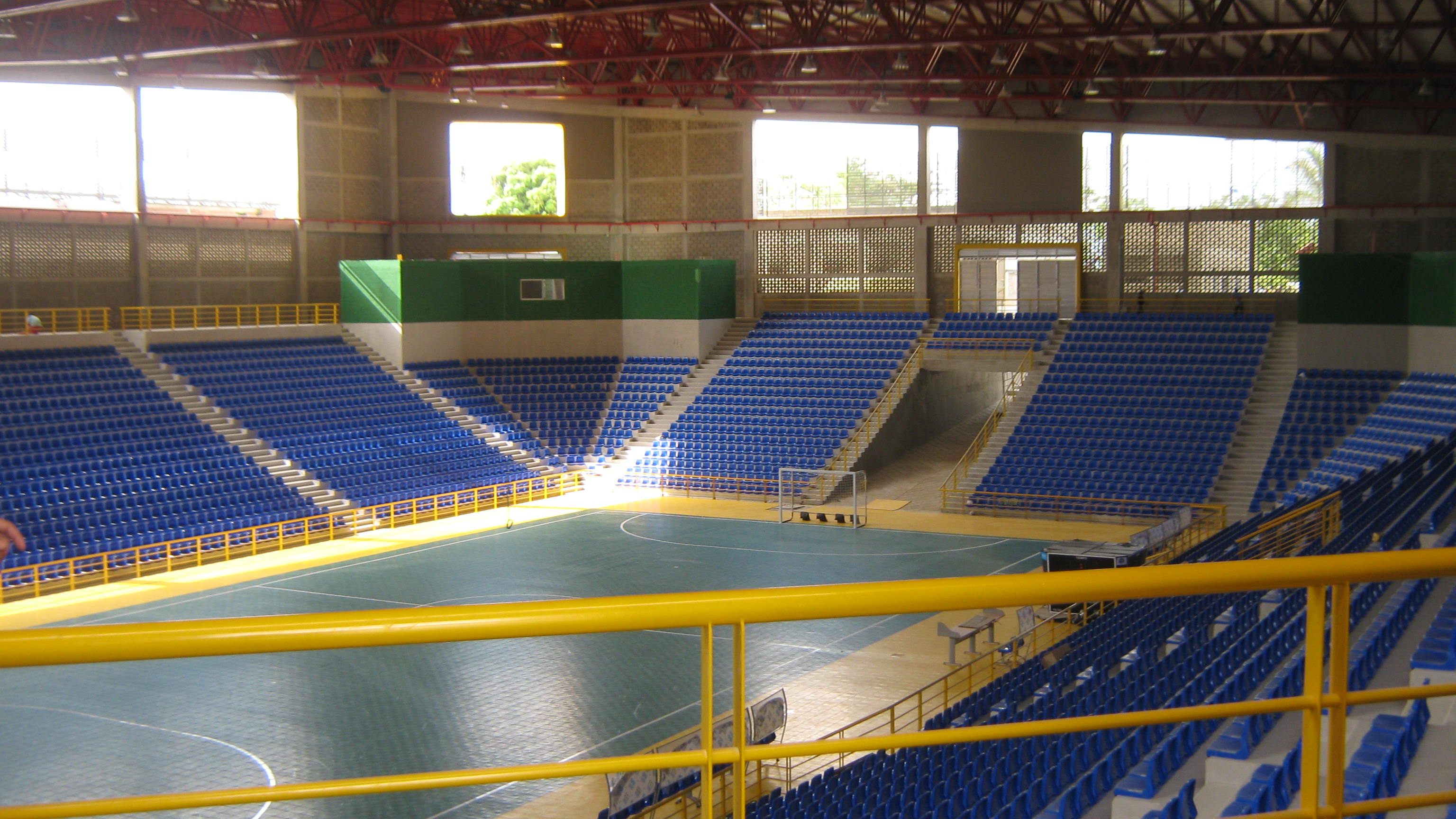
The Coliseo Bicentenario, built in 2011.

The Coliseo Bicentenario, built for the 2011 AMF Futsal World Championships held in Colombia, has a capacity of 8,000 spectators. It is currently the home stadium of the Búcaros Santander basketball team.

Another sports complex in the city is the Edmundo Luna Santos Coliseum, located in the Ciudadela Real de Minas area.

Bucaramanga has twice hosted the National Games in 1941 and 1996. The city also hosted the Pan American Cycling Championships in the year 2000. Bucaramanga was one of the cities that hosted the 2016 FIFA Futsal World Cup.

== Transportation ==
- Local Bus: Metrolinea
- Intercity Bus: Terminal de Transportes de Bucaramanga
- Main airport: Palonegro International Airport

=== Bucaramanga Public Transportation Statistics ===
The average amount of time people spend commuting with public transit in Bucaramanga, for example to and from work, on a weekday, is 57 minutes. Ten percent of public transit riders, ride for more than 2 hours every day. The average amount of time people wait at a stop or station for public transit is 14 minutes, while 19% of riders wait for over 20 minutes on average every day. The average distance people usually ride in a single trip with public transit is 5.6 km, while 10% travel for over 12 km in a single direction.

== Tourism ==
- Chicamocha National Park

=== Malls ===
- El Cacique Mall
- Gratamira Mall

== Media ==
- Newspaper: Vanguardia Liberal
- Television: Televisión Regional del Oriente

== People from Bucaramanga ==
- Ruvén Afanador (born 1959), photographer
- Julián Leal (born 1990), racing driver
- Gustavo Lorgia (1951–2024), illusionist
- Carlos Ardila Lülle (1930–2021), businessman
