= Wohlde (Bergen) =

Coordinates: 52°48′45″N 10°00′02″E

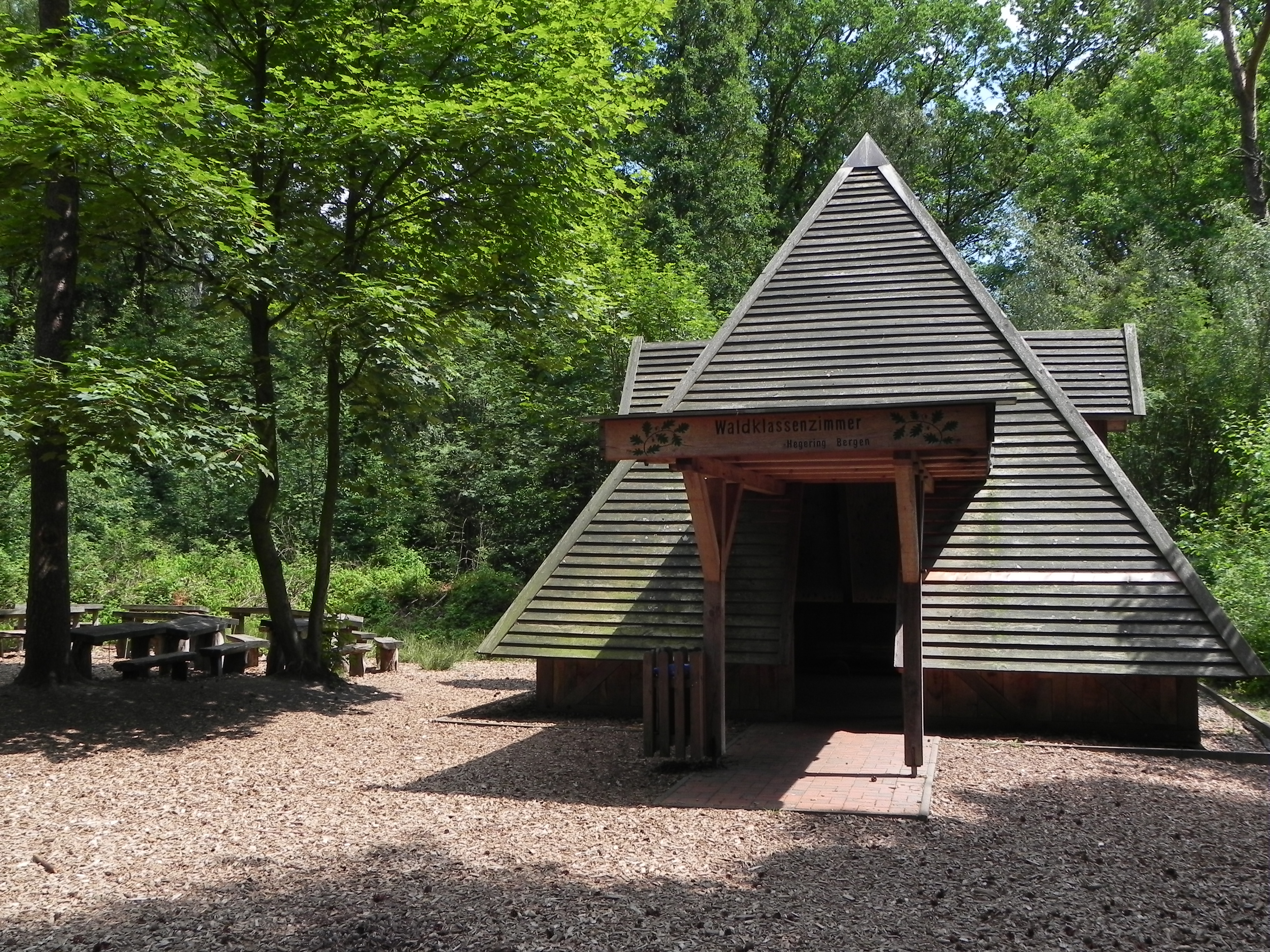
Forest classroom near Wohlde

Wohlde is a hamlet in the parish of Dohnsen, that belongs to the Lower Saxon borough of Bergen in North Germany. It lies in the northern part of the district of Celle on the Lüneburg Heath, 1 km east of Bergen, at a height of 77 to 81 m above sea level (NN). The name is derived from Berger Wohld (= "Berger Wald" i.e. Bergen Wood).

== History ==
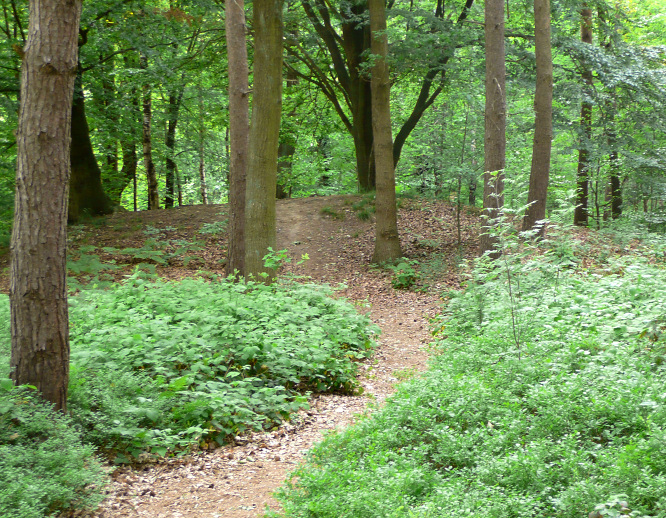
Bronze Age tumulus near Wohlde

=== Tumuli ===
600 metres northwest of Wohlde are 45 tumuli dating to the Nordic Old Bronze Age, most of which are located in a small wood. It is the largest burial site of its kind in the district of Celle. This burial site belonged to the so-called Lüneburg Culture (1500-1200 BC). Originally there were many more graves east of here, but over time they have disappeared thanks to agriculture. Only those predominantly located in the wooded hillocks have survived undisturbed to the present day. The dead were buried in hollowed-out oak trunks. Stones with burn marks were found at their heads. It is believed that these are stones from their domestic hearth. The oak coffins were covered with earth, which was supported by rings of stone walls to prevent the earth from collapsing. The numerous grave objects of jewelry and weapons suggest that the population at the time must have been wealthy.

=== Forest chapel ===
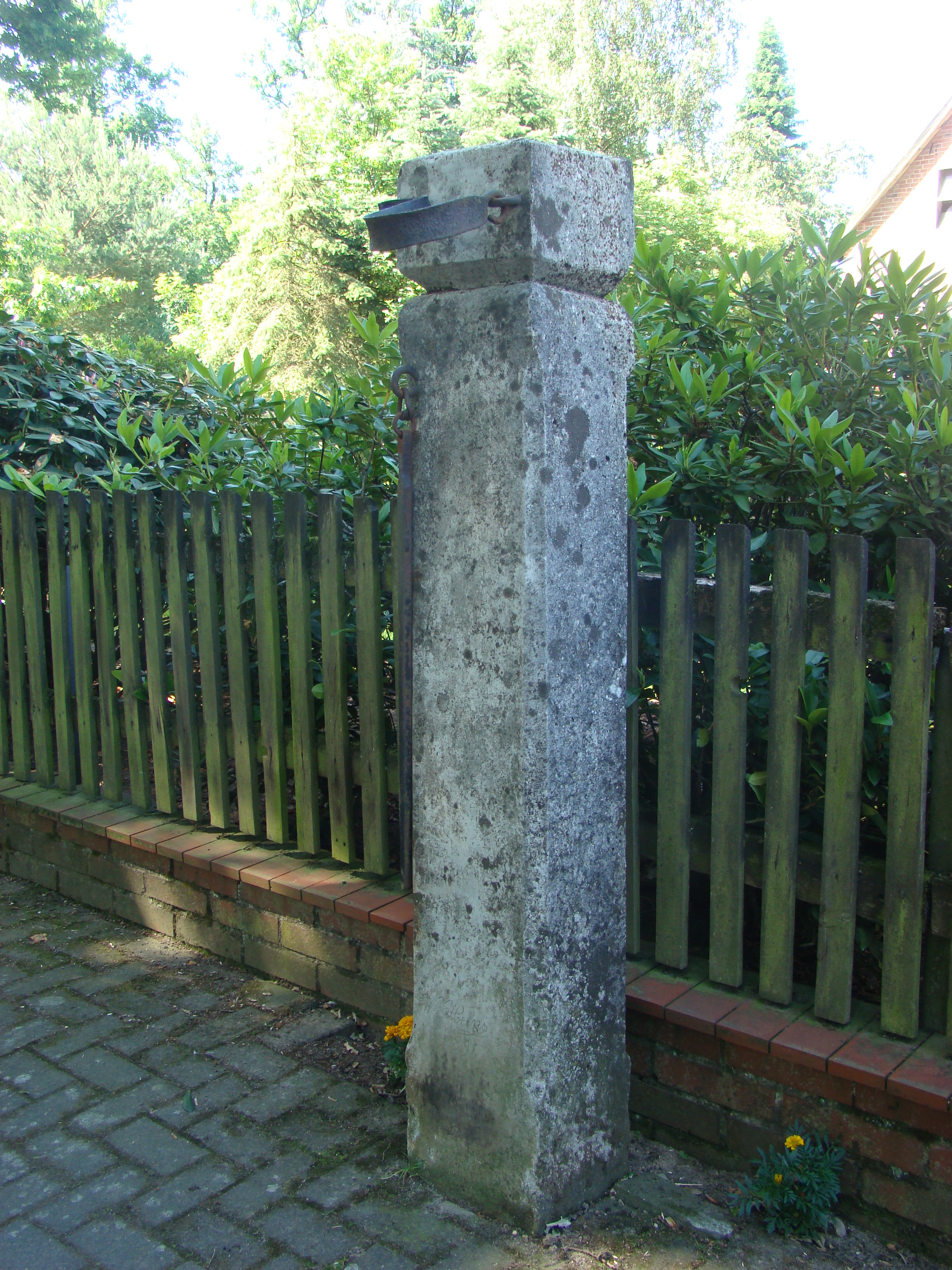
Replica of a pranger

Until about 1623 there was a forest chapel in Wohlde. It is believed to have stood near the sport where there is the replica of a pranger today.

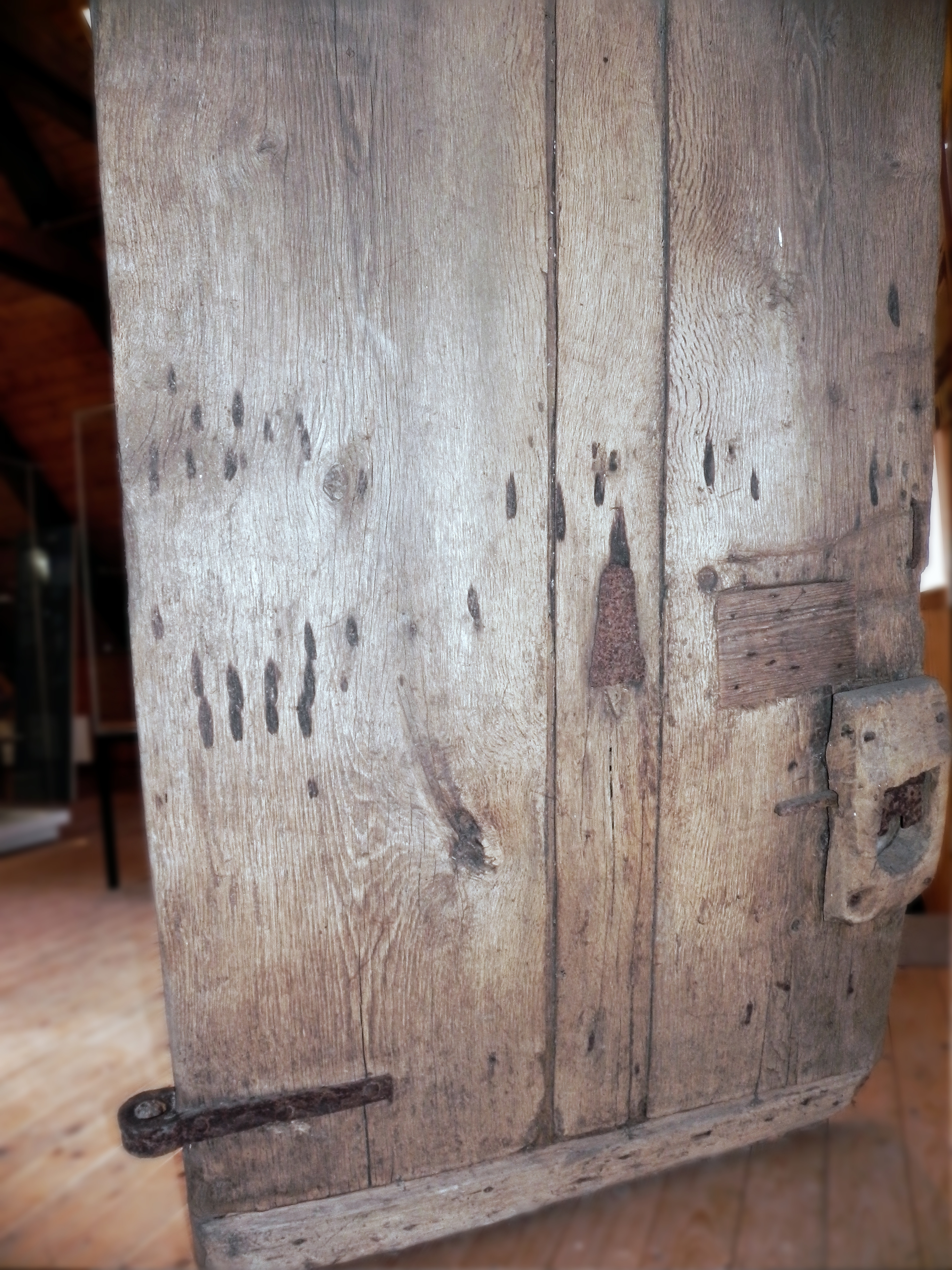
Chapel door in the Römstedthaus Museum in Bergen

The church (a "Mary chapel"), "the Chapel of Our Dear Lady, the Chapel of the Holy and Blessed Virgin Mary, the Mother of God in Berger Wohld" was probably built around 1383. The Bergen pastor and chronicler, Ludwig Spitta, wrote in 1875: And it is quite likely that it was the first chapel in our Bergen parish. Under Duke Henry of Brunswick-Lüneburg the chapel was given to St. Michael's Monastery in Lüneburg. On 31 January 1510 Pope Julius II issued the last letter of indulgence for the St. Michael's Monastery at Lüneburg, and this was for the pilgrims in Wohlde. The chapel became a popular place of pilgrimage. Several tradesmen were located nearby. There was also a small market that has survived to this day and is known nationally as the Wohlde Market. With the beginning of the Reformation, the chapel was closed. In the Thirty Years' War, it was completely destroyed. The chapel door, made of sturdy oak planks, has been preserved and is now the oldest exhibit in the Römstedthaus museum in Bergen.

== Economy ==
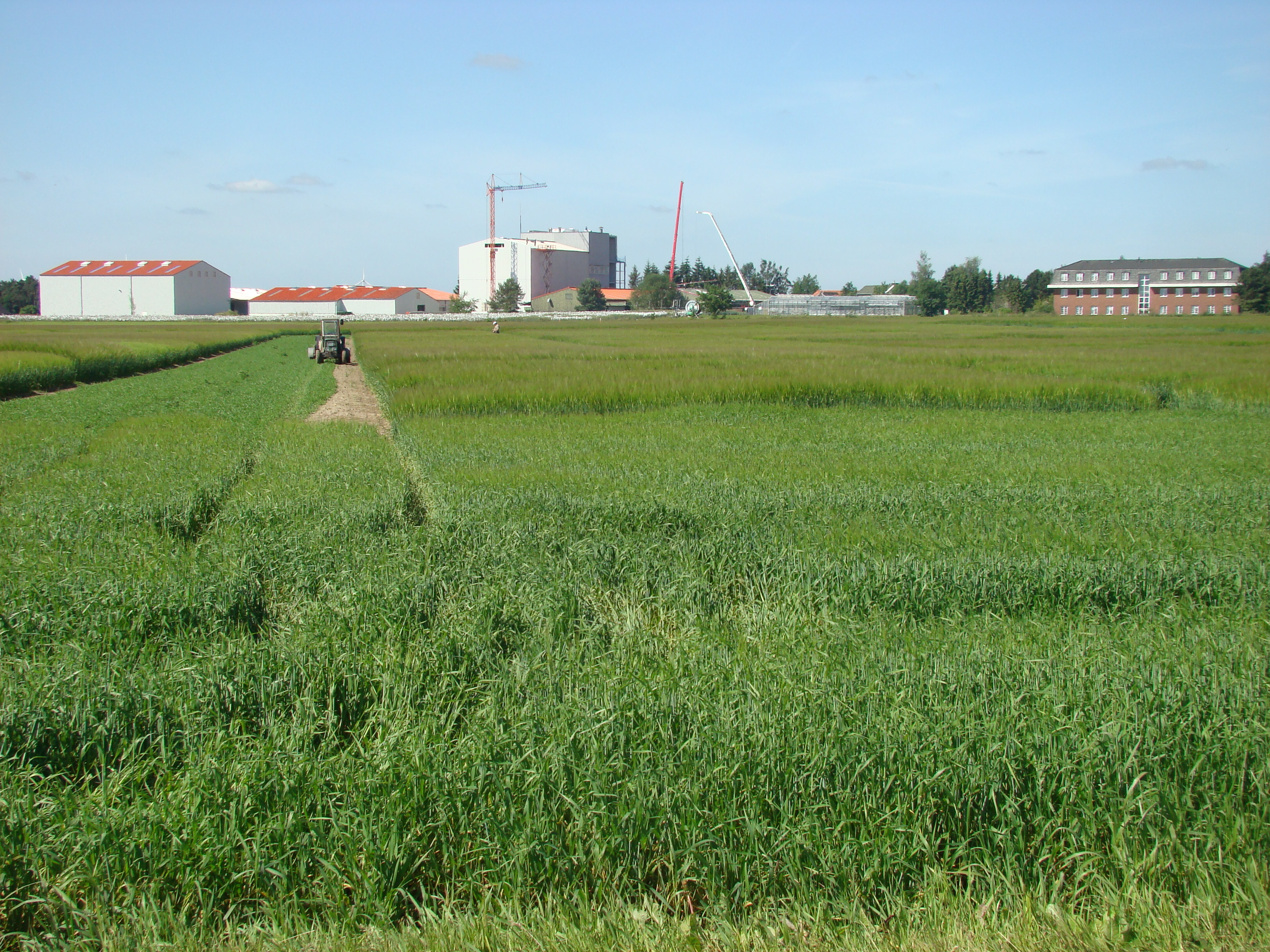
Factory site of KWS Lochow in Wohlde

KWS Lochow (formerly Lochow-Petkus), a subsidiary of KWS Saat, has its headquarters in Wohlde. The firm is a specialist in cereal breeding within the KWS Group and runs a total of four European companies in Germany, Great Britain, Poland and France. In Wohlde it has about 100 workers and employs a total of about 360 people overall. The company was founded in 1926 by Ferdinand von Lochow in Petkus (March of Brandenburg). It started as long ago as 1881 with rye breeding.

== Places of interest ==
In a wooded area northwest of Wohlde the Bergen Conservancy has created a so-called "forest classroom". A pyramid-shaped structure, about five feet high and made of wood, can be used as a classroom. There is also a forest trail, a pond biotope, various information boards and reference material about nature and the coexistence of man and nature.
