= Mission fig =

Variety of fig

Ficus carica 'Mission'
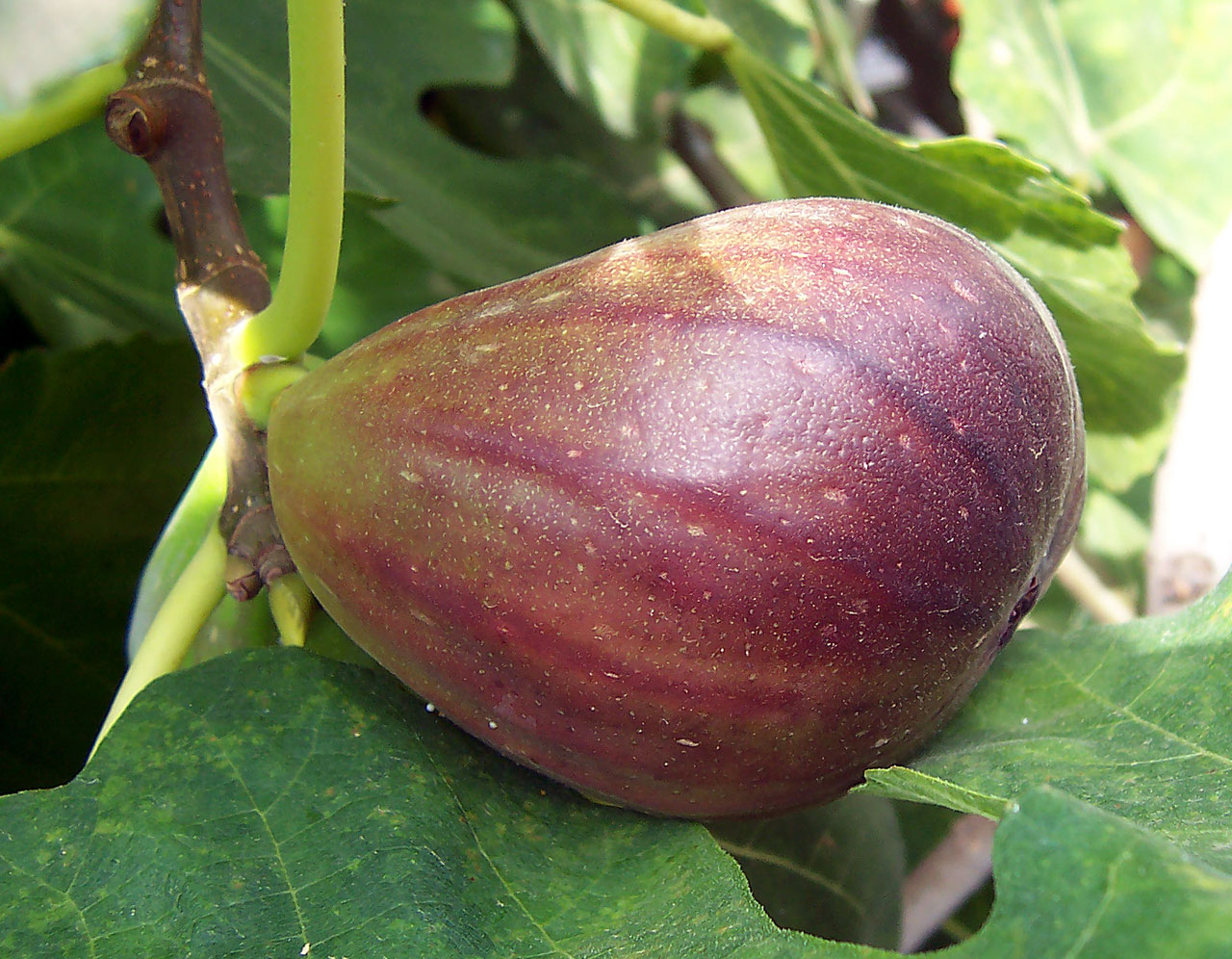
- Species: Ficus carica
- Cultivar: Ficus carica 'Mission'

Native to Spain, the Mission fig (also known as Black Mission or Franciscana) is a popular variety of the edible fig (Ficus carica). It was first introduced to the continental U.S. in 1768 by Franciscan missionaries in San Diego; it was planted in Mexico around 1520 and then north along the Californian coastline as Catholic missions were constructed along the historic Missions Trail in the late 18th century. Present in the gardens of Mission San Diego, mission figs had been as far north as Fresno in the San Joaquin Valley by the late 19th century. Gustav Eisen writes, "The early padres and missionaries in the Pacific Coast States cultivated no other variety of fig." It became the main commercial variety planted throughout California, though later surpassed by the Sari Lop fig (Calimyrna) as the most popular variety.

A high-quality variety, the Mission fig produces both a breba and a main crop and is considered everbearing when in the right climate. The breba crop is large; the main crop is medium-sized and dark-skinned with a strawberry-colored interior. Its skin often cracks when ripe. Mission figs are harvested in two crops, the first in spring and the second in late summer through early winter. Dried figs are available year-round.

Though sensitive to frost, long-lived and quite large (3 – 6 meters tall) is the deciduous tree. However, the fig mosaic virus, which can affect the color and shape of leaves but usually not fruit production, almost always infects it. Regardless, the Mission is still considered one of the highest-quality figs that can be grown in USDA zones 9 and up in the United States.

== See also ==
- Mission (olive)
- Common fig
