= Dohnsen-Siddernhausen Dolmen =

Dolmen in North Germany

Coordinates: 52°49′31.40″N 10°01′37.15″E

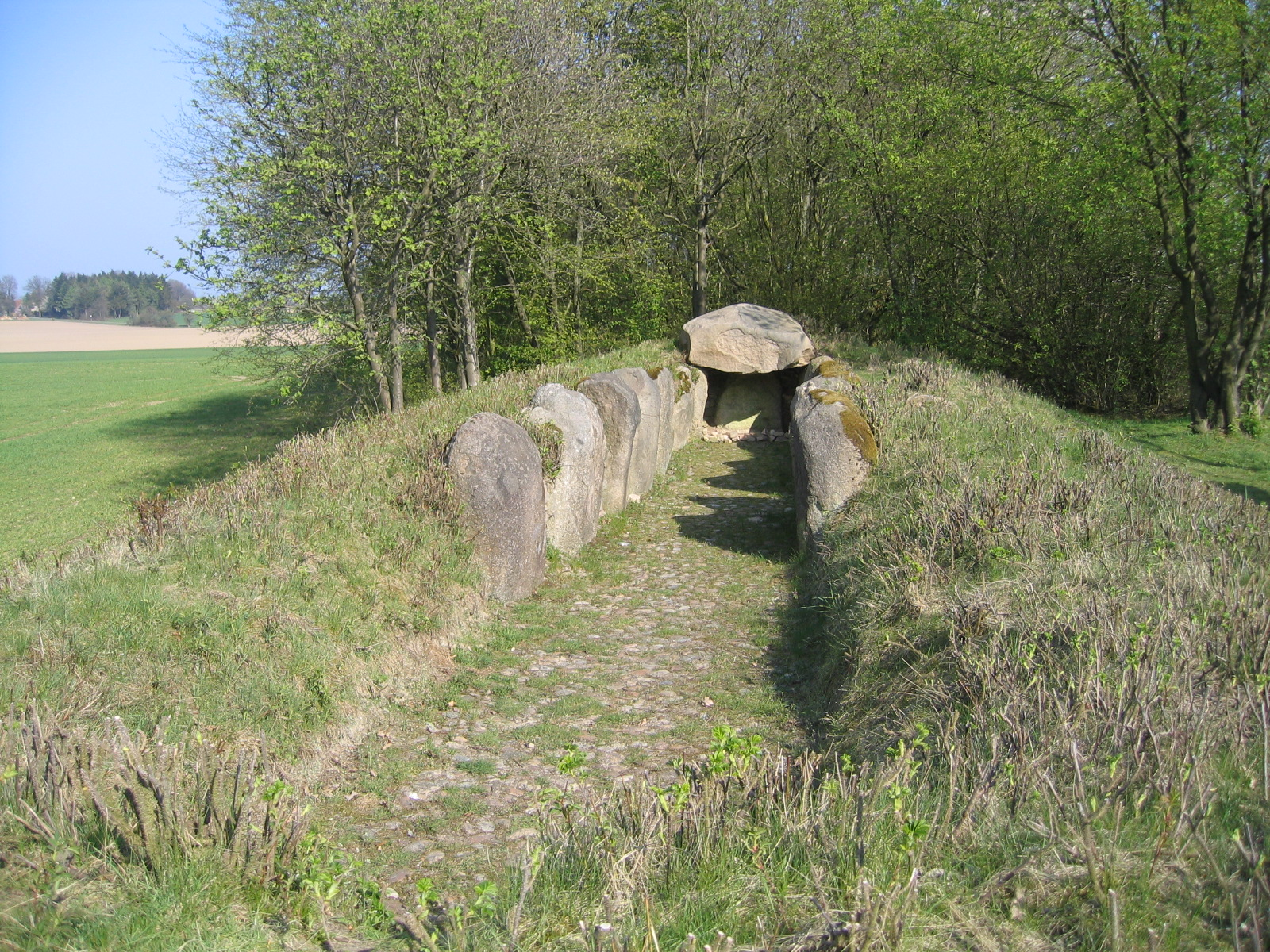
Dolmen near Dohnsen and Siddernhausen

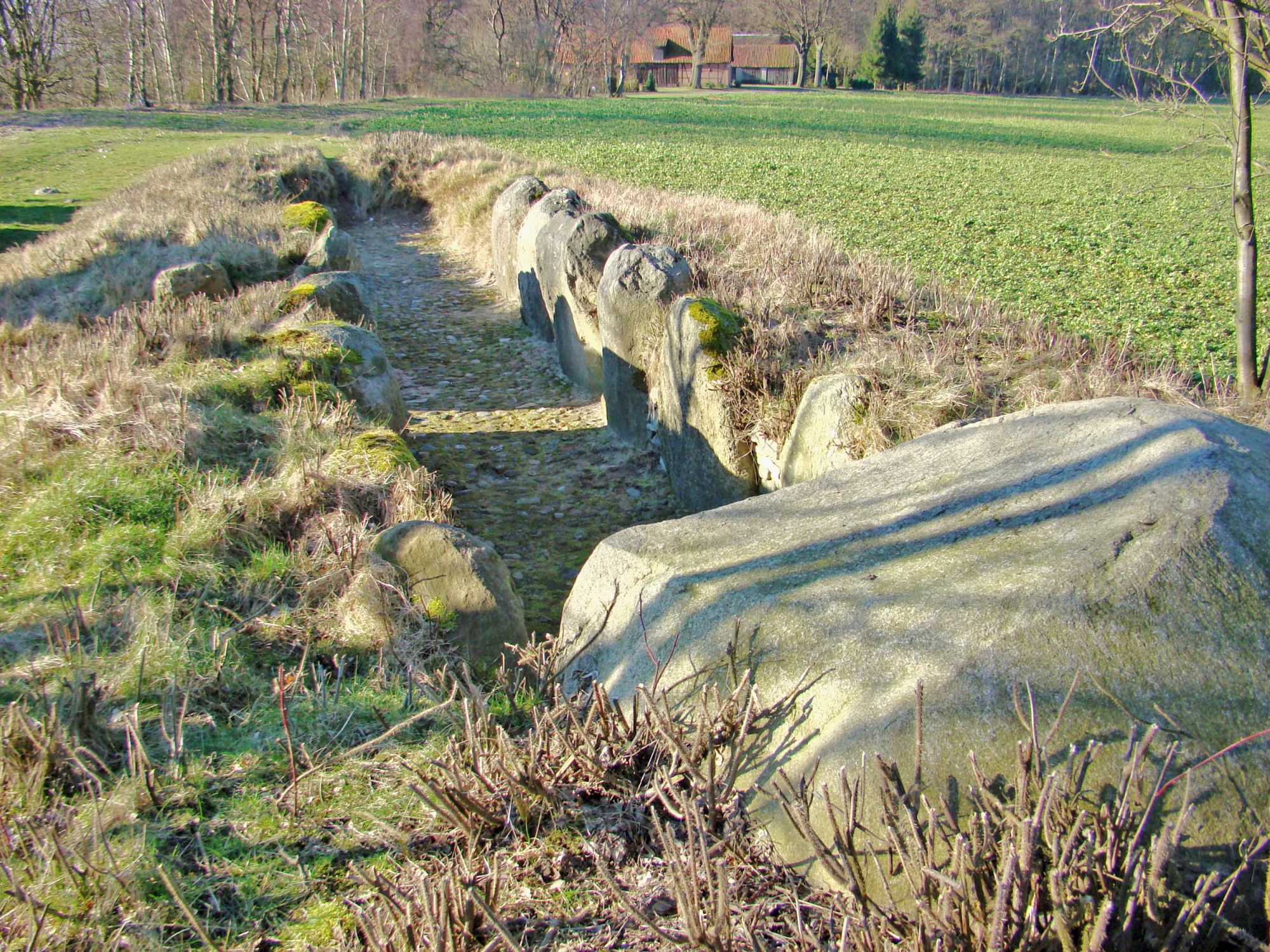
Dolmen near Dohnsen and Siddernhausen

The dolmen (German: Großsteingrab) on a low elevation between the villages of Dohnsen and Siddernhausen near the town of Bergen in North Germany, was originally 500 m further north. It was excavated in 1977 and reconstructed in its present location. This dolmen from the New Stone Age is believed to have been destroyed in the 17th or 18th century, because its large stones lay scattered on the fields. Several of the stones were sunk into the ground, others had been carried away. As a result, a considerable amount of the original material has been lost.

Excavations revealed that the burial chamber originally comprised 20 to 24 upright stones and about 8 capstones. It had a side entrance; this type of grave is known as a passage grave. The open space between the uprights and the capstones was sealed in with dry stonework. The entire grave was probably covered by an earth mound originally. This site may have served as a burial ground for several generations. The dead were laid on the floor of the burial chamber and prepared for the afterlife by being buried with their traditional jewellery (Trachtenschmuck), earthenware jars and everyday implements.

== Sources ==
- Infotafel des Instituts für Denkmalpflege – Außenstelle Lüneburg – in Zusammenarbeit mit dem Landkreis Celle
