= Gustavo Lorgia =

Colombian illusionist (1951–2024)

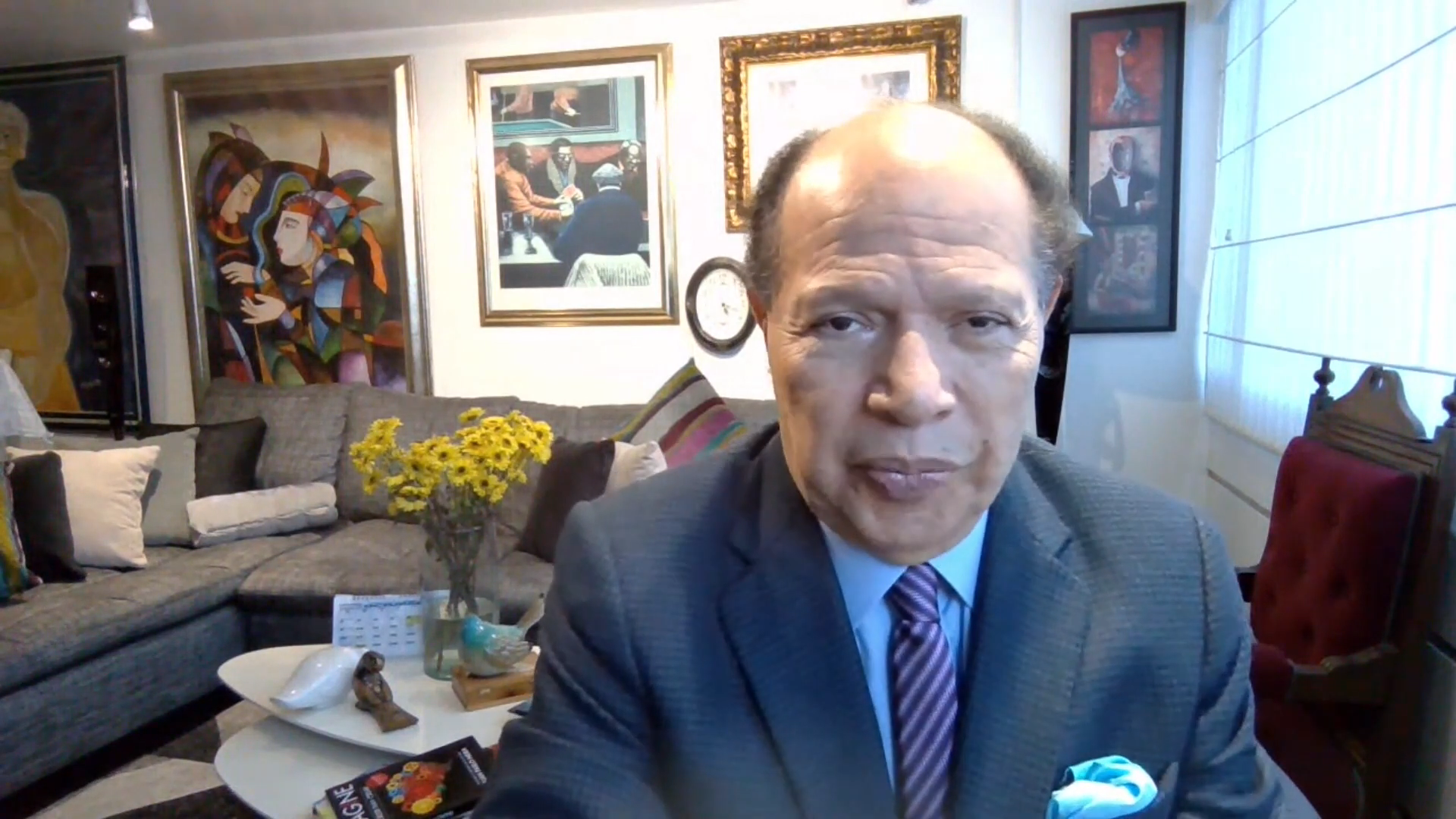
- Lorgia in 2023
- Born: Gustavo Adolfo Lorgia Vanegas; 18 May 1951; Bucaramanga, Colombia
- Died: 14 June 2024 (aged 73); Bogotá, Colombia
- Occupations: Illusionist, businessman
- Years active: 1971–2020
- Children: Maria Paula and Gustavo Lorgia Garnica
- Father: Gustavo Lorgia Camacho

Gustavo Adolfo Lorgia Vanegas (Spanish pronunciation: [gus'taβo a'ðolfo 'loɾxja βa'neɣas]; 18 May 1951 – 14 June 2024) was a Colombian businessman and an illusionist. He was one of Latin America's best known illusionists.

== Life ==
Lorgia was born in Bucaramanga. From childhood he followed in his father's and grandfather's footsteps as they worked as magicians. In 1971, he participated in the congress of magic in Zaragoza, Spain. He lived in Madrid, working for a news programme's entertainment section.

Lorgia presented various performances throughout Europe and the Middle East, and acted for Le Caire Auberge des Pyramides (Note: This name has been corrected to proper French spelling; in the Spanish Wikipedia source, it reads Le Cairo Auberge des Piramides.) before such members of the jet set as Jacqueline Kennedy and Aristotle Onassis, or before Arab sheikhs.

In 1980, Lorgia first began the development of his career on the television programme Mágico-Mágico and also took part in presentations on Festival Internacional del Humor (another television programme). Between 1988 and 2020, he was president of the Club Colombiano de Artes Mágicas, and between 1989 and 2020, he headed the Federación Latinoamericana de Sociedades Mágicas (FLASOMA).

In 1992, Lorgia organized the International Congress of Magic in Bogotá. In 2008, a bill was introduced in Colombia that would forbid presenting and keeping wild animals and marine mammals in circuses and public spectacles. In June 2013, the bill was passed into law and is known as Law 1638. It forbids the use of wild animals, whether native or exotic, in circuses, whether fixed or itinerant. It gave animals protection. However, it also had certain implications for Lorgia's profession, for the new law meant that animals were not to be used in any show, as confirmed by Colombia's Constitutional Court after the law's constitutionality was challenged the next year.

== Death ==
On 14 June 2024, Lorgia died in Bogotá from cerebral complications after being diagnosed with a spinal cord injury and staying in hospital for 20 days, according to his children. He was 73. Days earlier, there had been false reports of Lorgia's death on social media, but Lorgia himself had denied these stories.

In a tribute, El Heraldo said of him "He made luxury cars disappear, pulled doves or rabbits out of hats, sawed ladies in half, did illusions with sticks or umbrellas, he was one of the most creative people in the country."
