= Metrolínea =

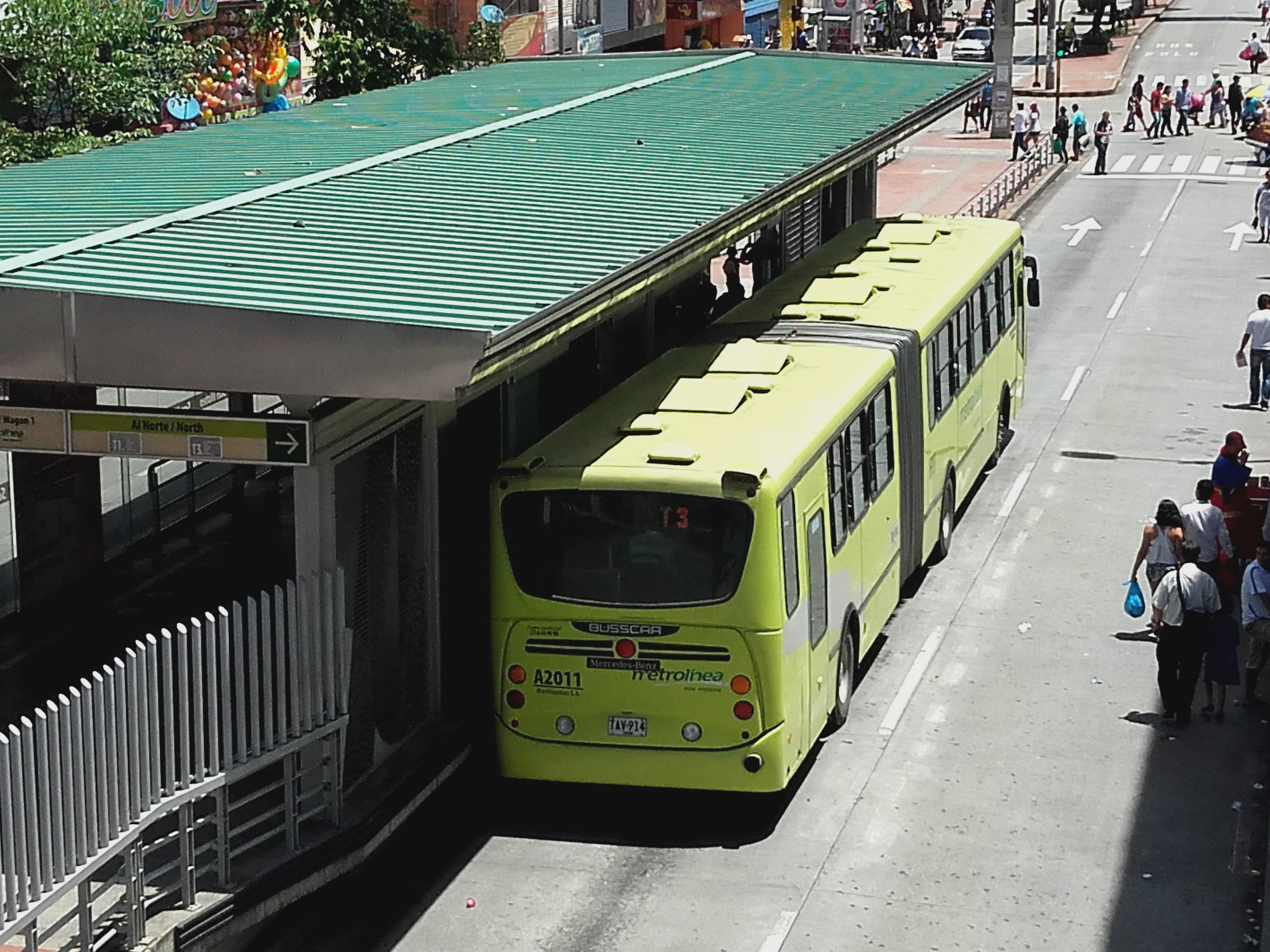

Overview
- Locale: Bucaramanga, Colombia
- Transit type: Bus rapid transit
- Number of lines: 2
- Number of stations: 139
- Daily ridership: 245,000 daily
- Annual ridership: 2.4 million (2025)
- Website: Metrolínea

Operation
- Began operation: December 22, 2009
- Operator: Metrolínea

Technical
- System length: 7.5 km (4.7 mi)

Metrolínea is the mass transportation system that operates in Bucaramanga, in the department of Santander, Colombia. It operates green buses and is managed by Tisa, an enterprise that is managed by Dr. Carlos Arenas, a Bucaramangaian engineer. Metroline operates 50 buses, and goes through the most important places of Bucaramanga and Piedecuesta, a nearby town.

Metrolinea ceased operations on April 27, 2026. Vandalism of stations and low ridership are to blame.
