= Geo von Lengerke =

German engineer and merchant (1827–1882)

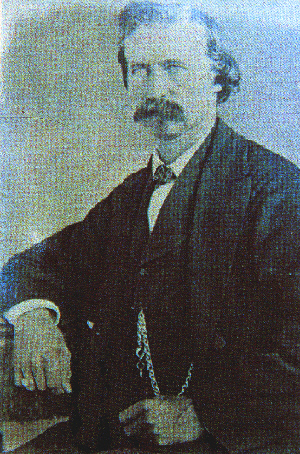
Geo Von Lengerke portrait

Geo von Lengerke (born August 31, 1827 Georg Ernst Heinrich von Lengerke, Dohnsen (Weser) in the then Duchy of Brunswick in northern Germany; died July 1882 in Zapatoca, Santander, Colombia) was a German engineer, merchant and landowner.

== Biography ==
Possibly running from the law after killing a man in a duel over a woman, Von Lengerke left Germany and went to Colombia in 1852, where he settled down in the then state of Santander. Once settled, he dedicated himself to cultivation of cinchona (quina) and its commercialization as well as road construction and land development. His property spread over 12,000 hectares. His best-known haciendas were "Montebello" and "El Florito", located in what is now the town of Betulia, where he lived in a semi-feudal life of extravagance. The eventual failure of his colonization project, construction of an alternative route to the Magdalena River and the decline of the market for cinchona diminished his fortune and left him in ruin.

His name and figure became legendary in the region, and the 1977 novel by Pedro Gómez Valderrama, "La otra raya del tigre" (The tiger's other stripe) was based upon his life.
