= Autonomous University of Bucaramanga =

Coordinates: 7°06′59″N 73°06′18″W

Universidad Autónoma de Bucaramanga
- Motto: Esta es tu casa
- Type: Private
- Established: 1952
- Rector: Juan Camilo Montoya Bozzy
- Students: 12.000
- Location: Bucaramanga, Santander, Colombia
- Colors: Orange and white
- Website: http://www.unab.edu.co/

The Universidad Autónoma de Bucaramanga or UNAB (Autonomous University of Bucaramanga) is a private post-secondary education institution in Bucaramanga, Colombia. It was founded in 1952 under the name of Instituto Caldas. In 1956 the institution was recognized as a law school, and became a university under the current name in 1987. Administration, Law and Public Accounting are its oldest programs. It now offers 19 programs.
