= Mute (soup) =

Colombian soup

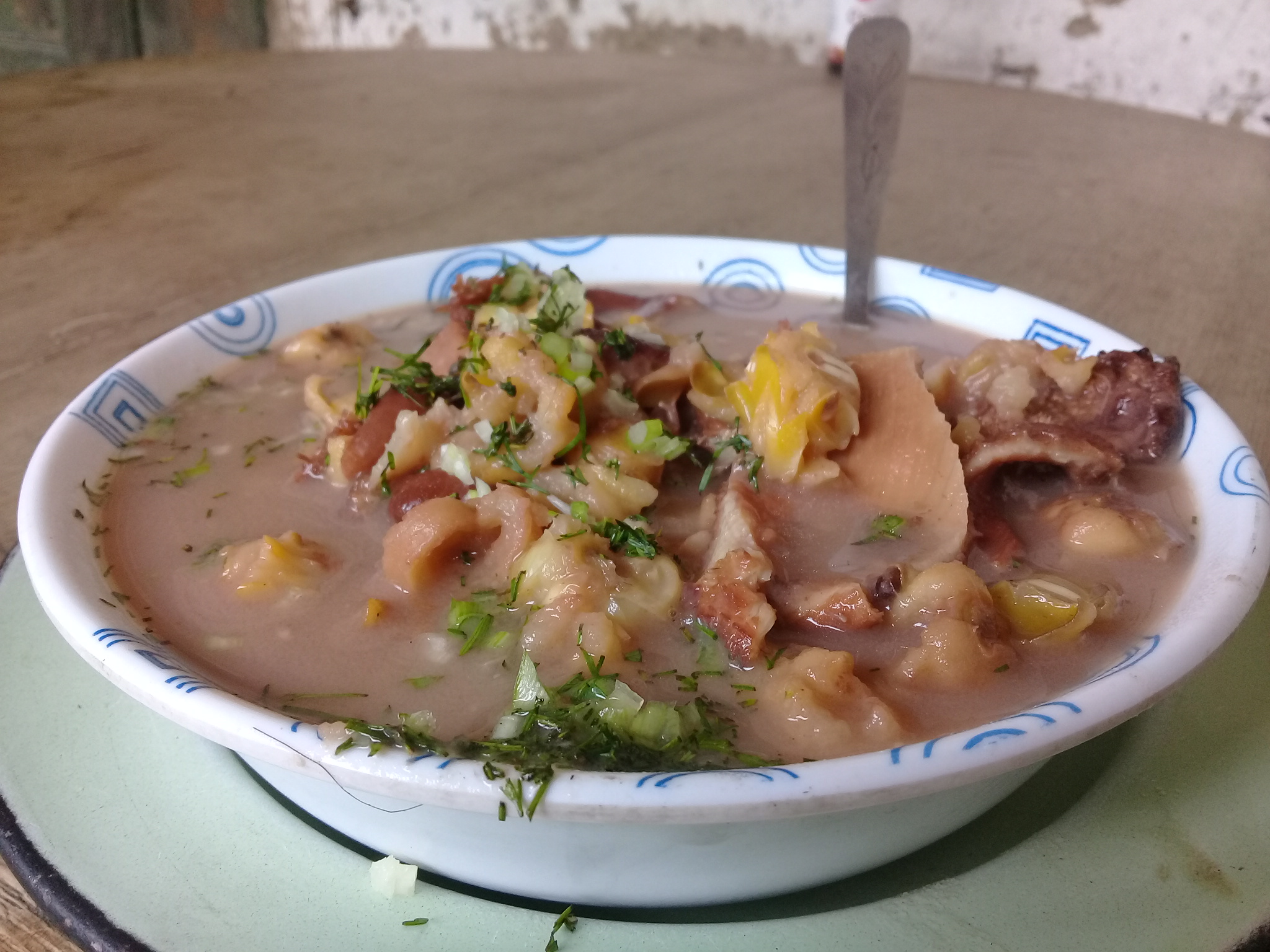
- Course: Soup
- Place of origin: Colombia
- Region or state: Boyacá and Santander departments
- Main ingredients: Boyacá: beef, potatoes Santander: pork parts, corn, vegetables

Mute is a Colombian cuisine soup from Boyacá and Santander departments.

The word may be used as slang for a whole corn soup in other areas. In Santander cuisine, ingredients include pork parts, corn, and vegetables. In Boyaca, beef and potato seem to be used more commonly. Goat meat can also be used.
