= Dohnsen =

- Ortsteil of Bergen
- Interactive map of Dohnsen
- Location within Germany Location within Lower Saxony
- Coordinates: 52°49′19″N 10°1′25″E
- Country: Germany
- State: Lower Saxony
- District: Celle
- Town: Bergen
- Elevation: 74 m (243 ft)

Population (2019)
  - Total: 762
- Time zone: UTC+01:00 (CET)
  - Summer (DST): UTC+02:00 (CEST)
- Postal codes: 29303
- Dialling codes: 05051

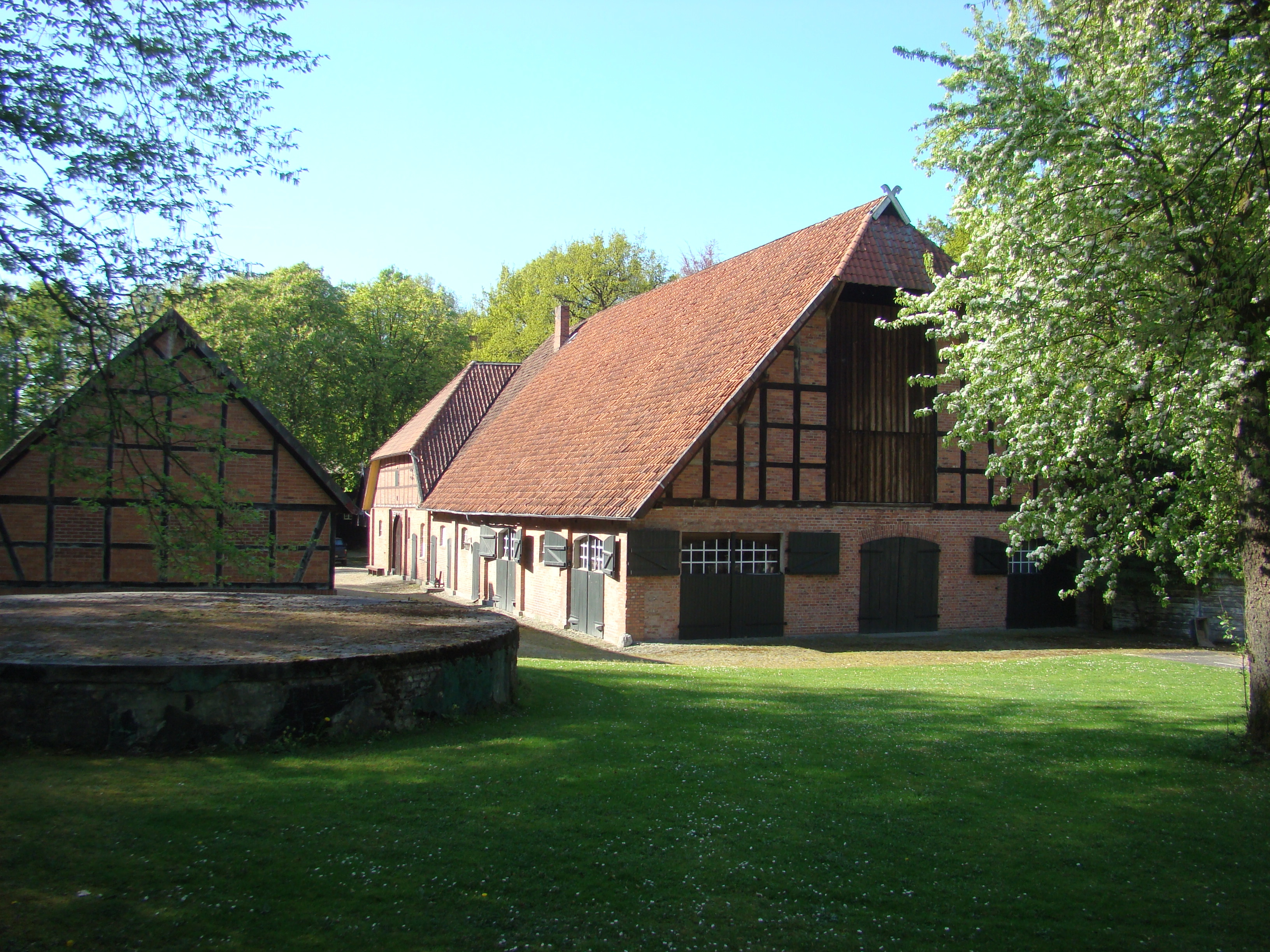
The Gehrshof, an old farmhouse

Dohnsen (German pronunciation: [ˈdoːnzn̩]) is a village administered by the Lower Saxon town of Bergen in northern Celle district on the Lüneburg Heath in North Germany. It lies 4 kilometres (2.5 mi) east of Bergen and has 762 inhabitants (as of 2019).

== History ==
Not far from Dohnsen is the Dohnsen-Siddernhausen Dolmen which dates back to the New Stone Age. In the woods there, near the hamlet of Wohlde, there are no less than 42 tumuli from the late Bronze Age dating from 1500 to 1200 BC, which are considered part of the Lüneburg Culture.

The first record of the village of Dohnsen was in 1330 when it was called Dodensen. Its outlying villages include Wohlde, Hünenburg, Roxhüllen, Salzmoor and Siddernhausen. Since the administrative reforms of the early 1970s, Dohnsen has been part of the municipality of Bergen. It has largely retained its village character. In Dohnsen there are still original farmsteads some of which have old stands of oak.

== Politics ==
Since the merging of local councils as part of the Lower Saxon administrative reforms of 1971, Dohnsen has been part of the town of Bergen. It is represented by a parish council (Ortsrat) and a chairman (Ortsbürgermeister). The council is empowered, inter alia, to make decisions about public services in the village, is responsible for maintaining the appearance of the village and for overseeing its clubs and societies, and has to be consulted by the town of Bergen on all important matters affecting the village. It consists of five elected representatives who, together with the chair, sit on the Bergen town council. The parish council elects its own chair. The current incumbent is Hartmut Stucke.

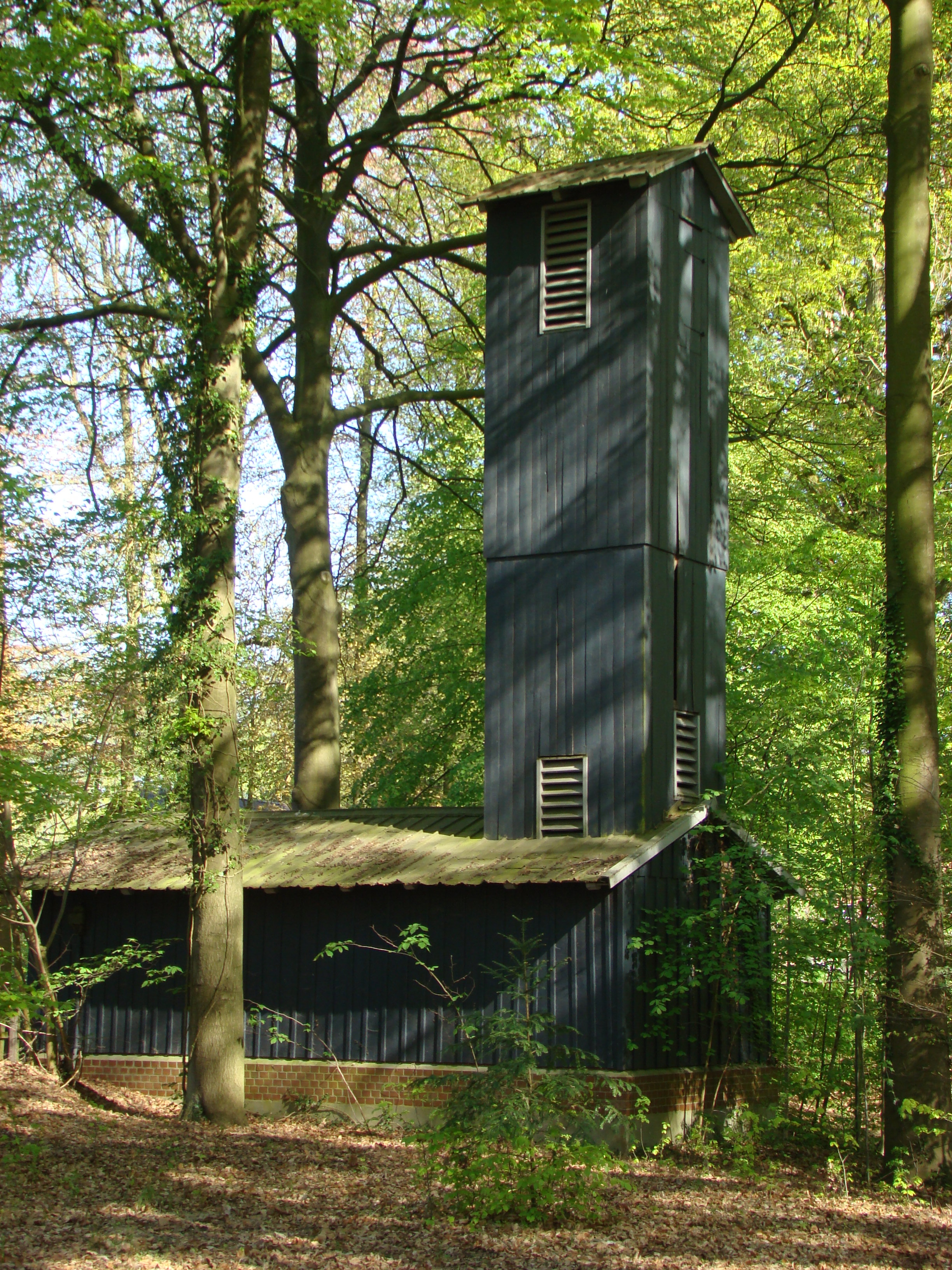
Old fire station with drying tower for hoses

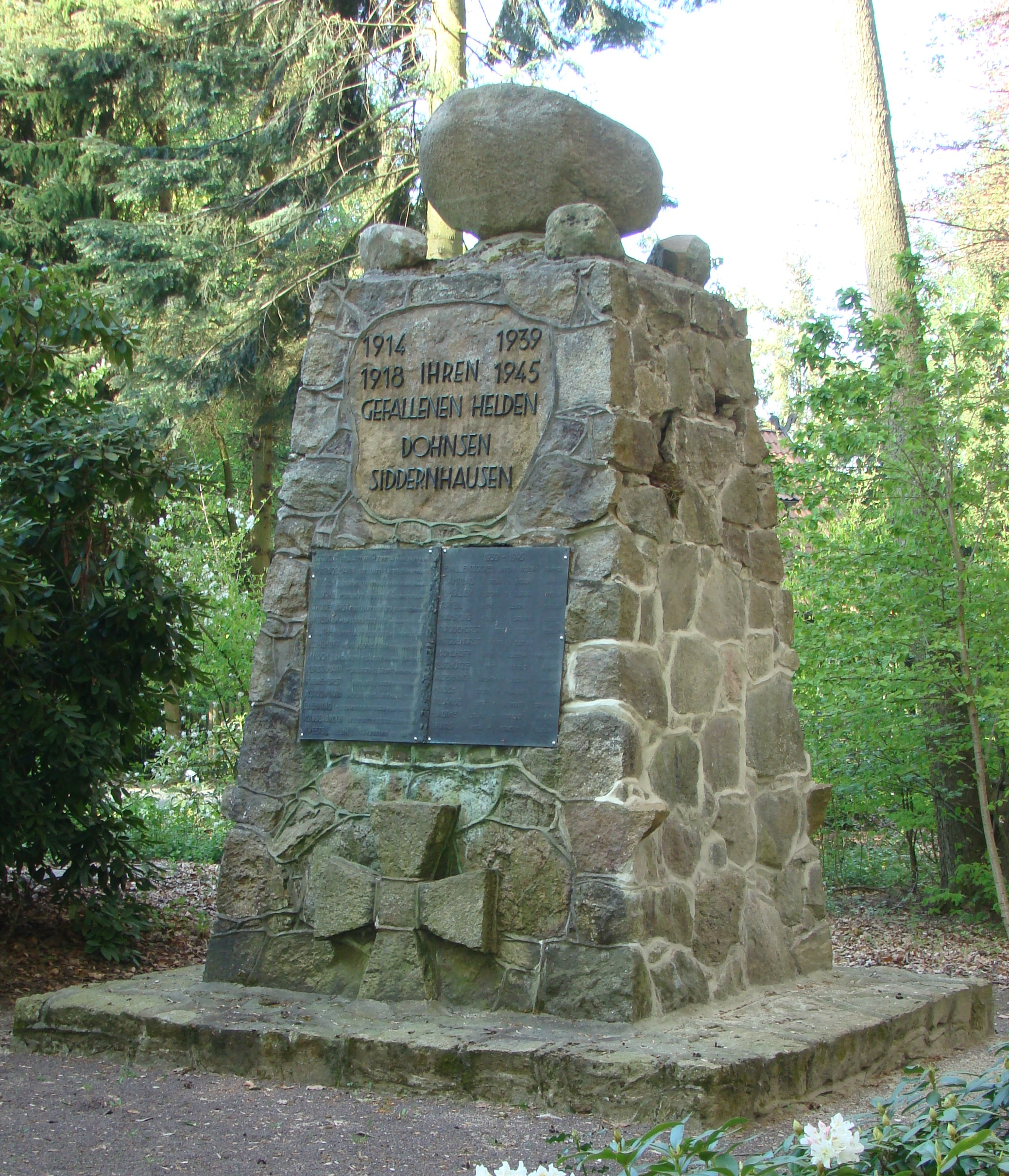
War memorial of the First and Second World Wars

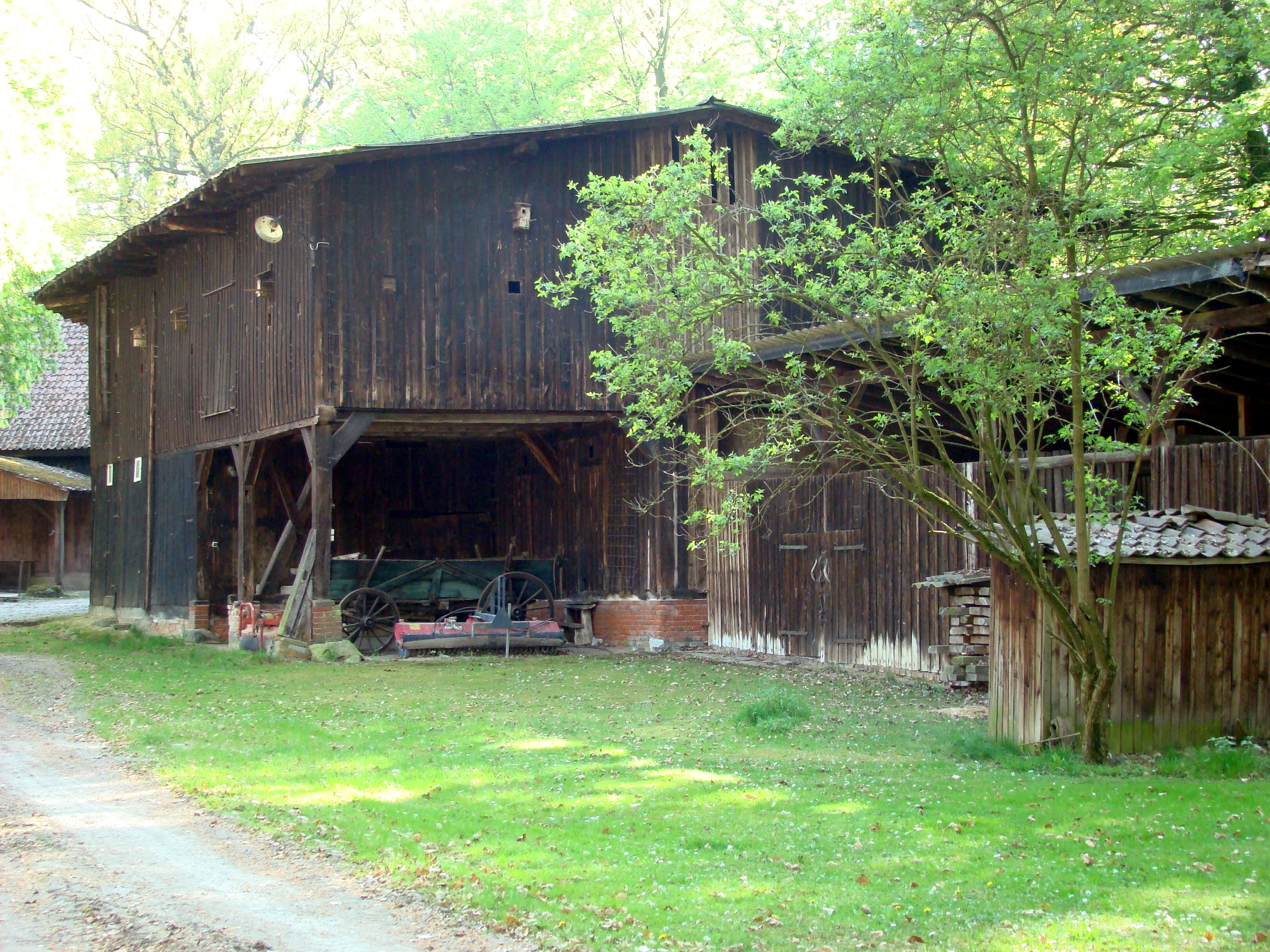
Old shed for agricultural implements

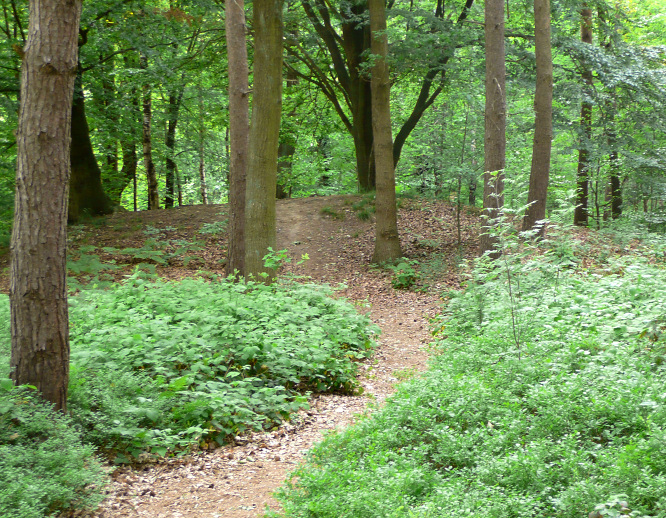
Bronze Age tumulus near Wohlde

== Literature ==
- Ewald Schrader - Chronik Dohnsen-Wohlde mit Siddernhausen, Roxhüllen, Hünenburg u. Salzmoor Bergen (1976)
