= Breba =

Fig fruit that grows on last year's shoots

A breba (from breva in Spanish) is a fig that develops in the spring on a common fig tree, on the previous year's shoot growth. In contrast, the main fig crop develops on the current year's shoot growth and ripens in late summer or fall. Certain cultivars of figs produce brebas that are of inferior quality; growers of those varieties frequently pick off and discard the brebas before they ripen, to encourage growth of the main crop. Other cultivars such as Black Mission, Croisic, and Ventura produce good breba crops.

In some climates the breba crop is likely to be destroyed by spring frosts; some climates do not have enough heat in summer for the main crop, so only the breba crop will have a chance to ripen.
