= Lache people =

Pre-Hispanic ethnic group of present-day Colombia

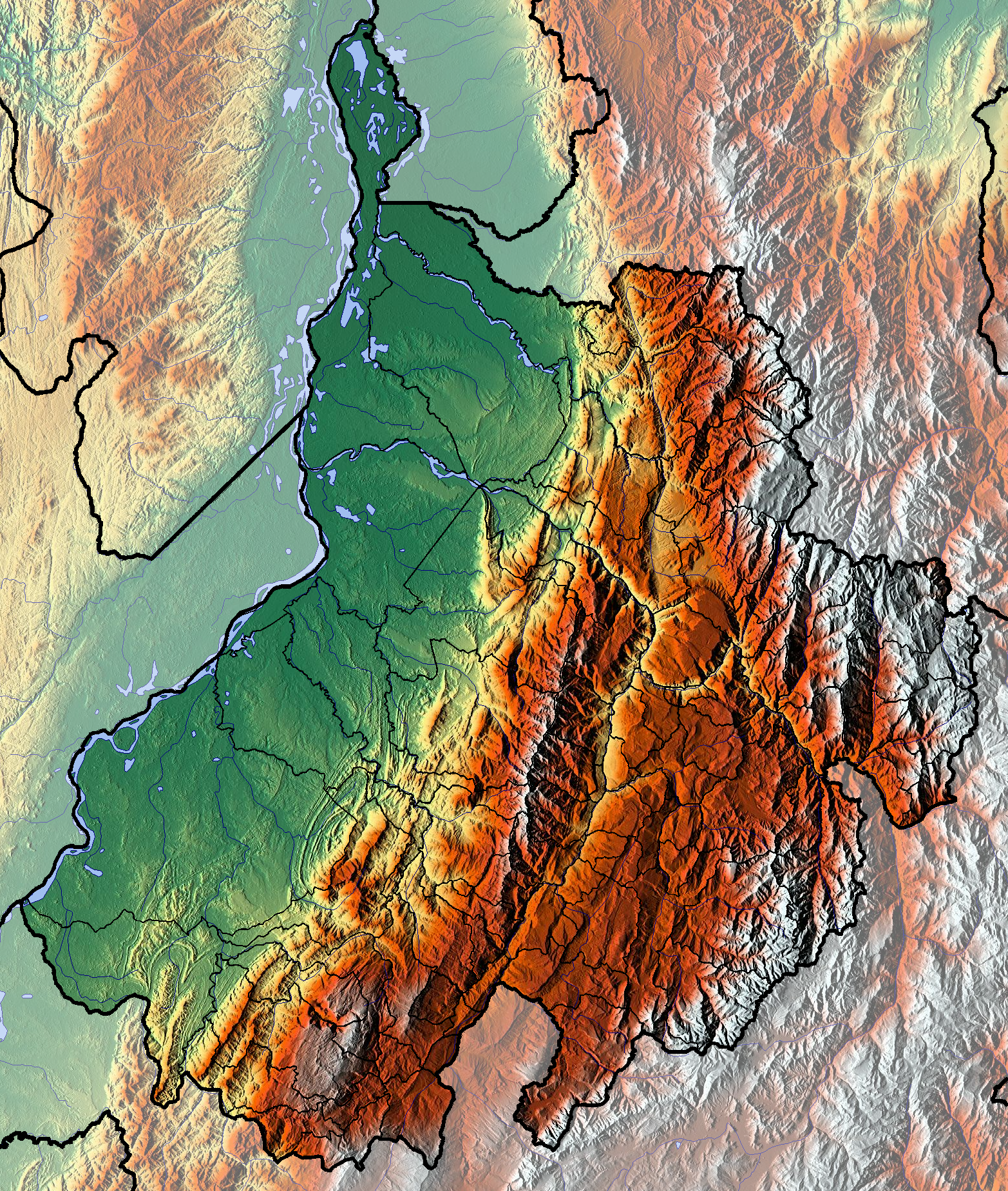
- Topography of Santander Department; The Lache lived in highlands of the eastern part, continuing into Boyacá

Total population
- 0 (2004)

Regions with significant populations
- Santander, Boyacá, Colombia

Languages
- Chibcha

Religion
- Traditional

Related ethnic groups
- U'wa, Muisca, Guane

The Lache were an indigenous, agrarian people in the highlands of what is now central Colombia's northern Boyacá and Santander departments, primarily in Gutiérrez Province and García Rovira Province. They were part of the Cocuy Confederation and spoke Chibcha, trading predominantly with other Chibcha speakers, such as the Muisca, Guane, Pijao and Chitarero. Trade included salt and textiles, as well as food stuffs. The Lache farmed maize, potatoes, quinoa and cotton, among other crops.

In the 17th century, Lucas Fernández de Piedrahita wrote of the habit of the Laches in bringing up younger male children as culturally female.

The name Lache is preserved in a barrio of Bogotá known as Los Laches.

== Municipalities belonging to Lache territory ==
The Lache inhabited the highlands of eastern Santander and northern Boyacá and a small part of northwesternmost Casanare.

Name	Department	Altitude (m) urban centre	Map
Capitanejo	Santander	1090	
Carcasí	Santander	2080	
Cepitá	Santander	3000	
Cerrito	Santander	2220-4200	
Concepción	Santander	2005	
Enciso	Santander	1484	
Guaca	Santander	2401	
Macaravita	Santander	2320	
Málaga	Santander	2235	
Molagavita	Santander	2196	
San Andrés	Santander	1617	
San José de Miranda	Santander	2381	
San Miguel	Santander	2200	
Chiscas	Boyacá	2368	
Chita	Boyacá	2964	
El Cocuy	Boyacá	2750	
El Espino	Boyacá	2128	
Guacamayas	Boyacá	2296	
Jericó (shared with Muisca)	Boyacá	3100	
Panqueba	Boyacá	2258	
La Salina	Casanare	1400	
San Mateo	Boyacá	2500	
La Uvita	Boyacá	2700	

== See also ==
- Muisca
- Conquest of the Lache, Chibcha, U'wa
- Guane

== Bibliography ==
- Rodríguez, José Vicente (1992). "Características Físicas de la Población Prehispánica de la Cordillera Oriental de Colombia: Implicaciones Etnogenéticas". Maguaré. 8: 7–45.
- Rodríguez, José Vicente (1996). Dieta, Salud y Demografía Prehispánica en la Cordillera Oriental de Colombia: Mitos y Realidades Sobre el Bienestar Aborigen. Departamento de Antropología, Facultad Ciencias Humanas, Universidad Nacional de Colombia, Santafé de Bogotá.
- Trexler, Richard C. (1999). Sex and Conquest: Gendered Violence, Political Order, and the European Conquest of the Americas. Cornell University. pp. 1–304. ISBN 9780801484827.
