= Concepción, Santander =

Concepción
- Municipality and town
- Flag

- Location of the municipality and town of Concepción in the Santander Department of Colombia
- Coordinates: 6°46′16″N 72°41′53″W
- Country: Colombia
- Department: Santander Department
- Province: García Rovira Province
- Time zone: UTC-5 (Colombia Standard Time)

Concepción is a municipality of Santander, Colombia. It belongs to the García Rovira Province.

== History ==
It was founded in 1722 by Pedro Manuel Angarita and José Manuel Cáceres Enciso. It was capital of the province of García Rovira.

== Geography ==
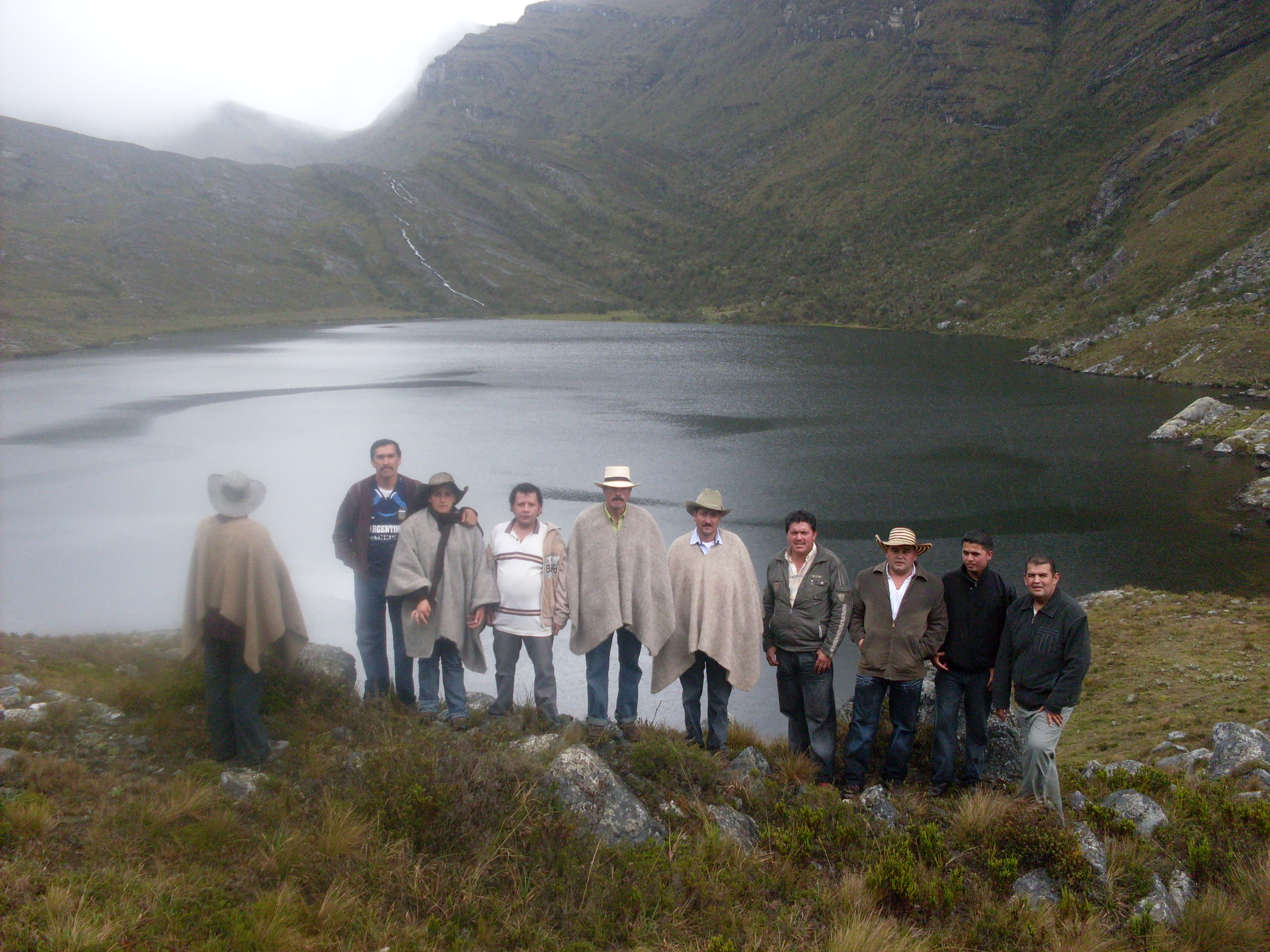
Laguna Arriviatada.

It is located on flat, cleared terrain, and has temperatures around 18 °C. The municipality occupies 686 km^{2}, and is bordered by Cerrito in the north; Carcasí, Enciso and Málaga in the south; Boyacá in the east; and Saint Andrés in the west.

The territory of the municipality is crossed by the Servitá and Sartanejo rivers.

== Demography ==
The municipality has 7,133 inhabitants, of which 2,508 live in the urban area and 4.625 in rural areas. It is one of the few municipalities of Santander that has pertaining inhabitants to the native community of the Uwas.

== Economy and tourism ==
Concepción is the wool production capital of Colombia and has several small factories dedicated to the production wool related products. The fairs of the village focus mainly on exhibitions Sheep, Graziers, Equidae and of wool products, in addition to handmade products. The inhabitants of the village are also engage in agriculture, mainly barley, wheat, potato, corn, beans, blackberry and curuba.

On December 8 the celebration in honor of the patron of the municipality, the Virgin of Inmaculada Concepción, is held. Delegations from colonies of different cities of the country return to this land to celebrate.
