= Oscar Rodríguez Naranjo =

Oscar Rodríguez Naranjo (1907–2006) was a painter from Socorro, Santander Department, Colombia. His works include mainly oil paintings and sculptures.

Rodríguez Naranjo studied at the Academy of Fine Arts of Bogotá. Owing to the talent he displayed he was able to obtain scholarships for the Académie Julian and the Académie de la Grande Chaumière in Paris.

He came back from France during the Second World War and settled in Bucaramanga. Rodríguez Naranjo taught at the art school while he made a number of paintings that would build up his reputation in Colombia. In 1941 he became the Director of the Academia de Bellas Artes in Bucaramanga.

The main themes of his paintings were portraits, including religious figures, nudes and landscapes. Rodríguez Naranjo was one of the most outstanding and representative artists of the Colombian Santander region.

== Sculptures ==
Some of Rodríguez Naranjo's most notable sculptures are:

- José Antonio Galán statue, located in the main park in Socorro
- María Antonia Santos Plata, one of the great figures of the Colombian Independence Struggle, sculpture, located in the main park in San Gil

== Exhibitions and Public Collections ==
These are some of his most important collections:

- 1929: Casa del Estudiante, Bogotá
- 1931: I Salón de Artistas Colombianos, Bogotá
- 1933: Centro de Historia de Santander, Bucaramanga
- 1938: Académie Julian Yearly Exhibition, Paris, France
- 1943: Muestra Annual, Academia de Bellas Artes, Colegio Santander, Bucaramanga
- 1945: Muestra de la Academia de Bellas Artes, Bucaramanga
- 1951: Museo de Antioquia, Medellín
- 1959: Exposición de Artistas Santandereanos, Bucaramanga
- 1963: Banco de la República, Bucaramanga.
- 1975: Paisaje, Museo de Arte Moderno (MAM), Bogotá
- 1981: Antología 365 años de Pintura en Santander, Corporación Cultural Luis Perú De la Croix, Bucaramanga.
- 1981: Retrospectiva, Retratos, Cámara de Comercio, Bucaramanga
- 1983: Artistas del Socorro, Casa de la Cultura, El Socorro, Santander.
- 1987: Paisaje en Santander, Banco de la República, Bucaramanga.
- 1994: Forma y Color Colombia, Hotel La Fontana, Bogotá.
- 2006: Forma y Color Colombia, Galería Actualidad, Bucaramanga

== Bibliography ==
- Dario Ortiz, Oscar Rodríguez Naranjo, the painter of beauty (1996)
