= Hurricane Iota =

Category 4 Atlantic hurricane in 2020

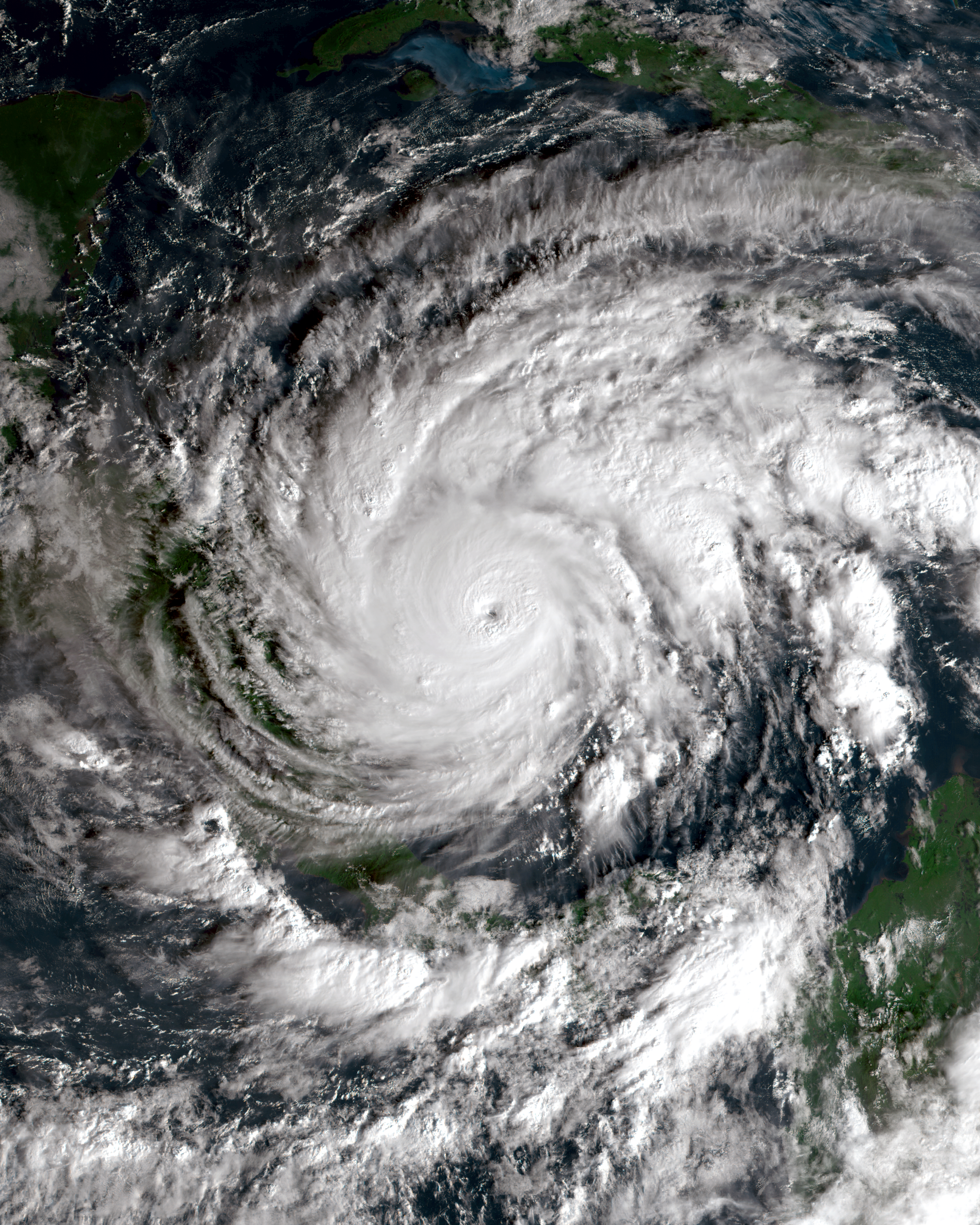
- Hurricane Iota approaching Nicaragua on November 16

Meteorological history
- Formed: November 13, 2020
- Dissipated: November 18, 2020

Category 4 major hurricane
- 1-minute sustained (SSHWS/NWS)
- Highest winds: 155 mph (250 km/h)
- Lowest pressure: 917 mbar (hPa); 27.08 inHg

Overall effects
- Fatalities: 84 total
- Missing: 41
- Damage: $1.4 billion (2020 USD)
- Areas affected: ABC islands; Colombia; Venezuela; Jamaica; Central America; Mexico
- IBTrACS
- Part of the 2020 Atlantic hurricane season

Hurricane Iota was a powerful and catastrophic late-season tropical cyclone which caused severe damage to areas of Central America already devastated by Hurricane Eta two weeks prior. The 31st and final tropical cyclone, 30th named storm, 14th hurricane, and record-tying seventh major hurricane of the record-breaking 2020 Atlantic hurricane season, Iota originated as a tropical wave that moved into the Eastern Caribbean on November 10. Over the next few days, the wave began to become better organized and by November 13, it developed into a tropical depression north of Colombia. The depression strengthened into Tropical Storm Iota six hours later. The storm was initially impacted by some wind shear, but a center relocation and relaxed shear allowed Iota to quickly strengthen into a hurricane on November 15, after which it underwent explosive intensification, peaking as a high-end Category 4 hurricane, with wind speeds of 155 mph (249 km/h). After weakening slightly, Iota made landfall in northeastern Nicaragua as a mid-range Category 4 hurricane, becoming the strongest recorded hurricane to make landfall in Nicaragua in November. Iota then rapidly weakened as it moved inland, dissipating on November 18.

Iota's precursor disturbance generated flash flooding on several Caribbean islands. Hurricane watches and warnings were first issued on November 14 in parts of Colombia, Nicaragua, and Honduras, with the latter two countries still recovering from Eta. Heavy rains associated with a tropical wave and Iota brought heavy rainfall to parts of Colombia, leading to flash flooding and mudslides. Heavy rain fell on much of Nicaragua, widening flash flooding caused by the hurricane's high storm surge. Mudslides caused extensive damage and multiple deaths. At least 67 people were killed due to Iota, including at least 28 in Nicaragua and 16 in Honduras, among other countries. As many as 41 people were reported as missing. The preliminary estimate for the damage in Nicaragua was US$564 million. Total damage estimates for the hurricane were set at US$1.4 billion.

Relief efforts soon followed, which included placing tents, opening temporary hospitals, and delivering food and water to those in need. Numerous power outages were restored in the days that followed. Donations worth hundreds of millions of United States dollars were given to affected countries. An estimated total of 5.2 million people were affected by the storm.

== Meteorological history ==
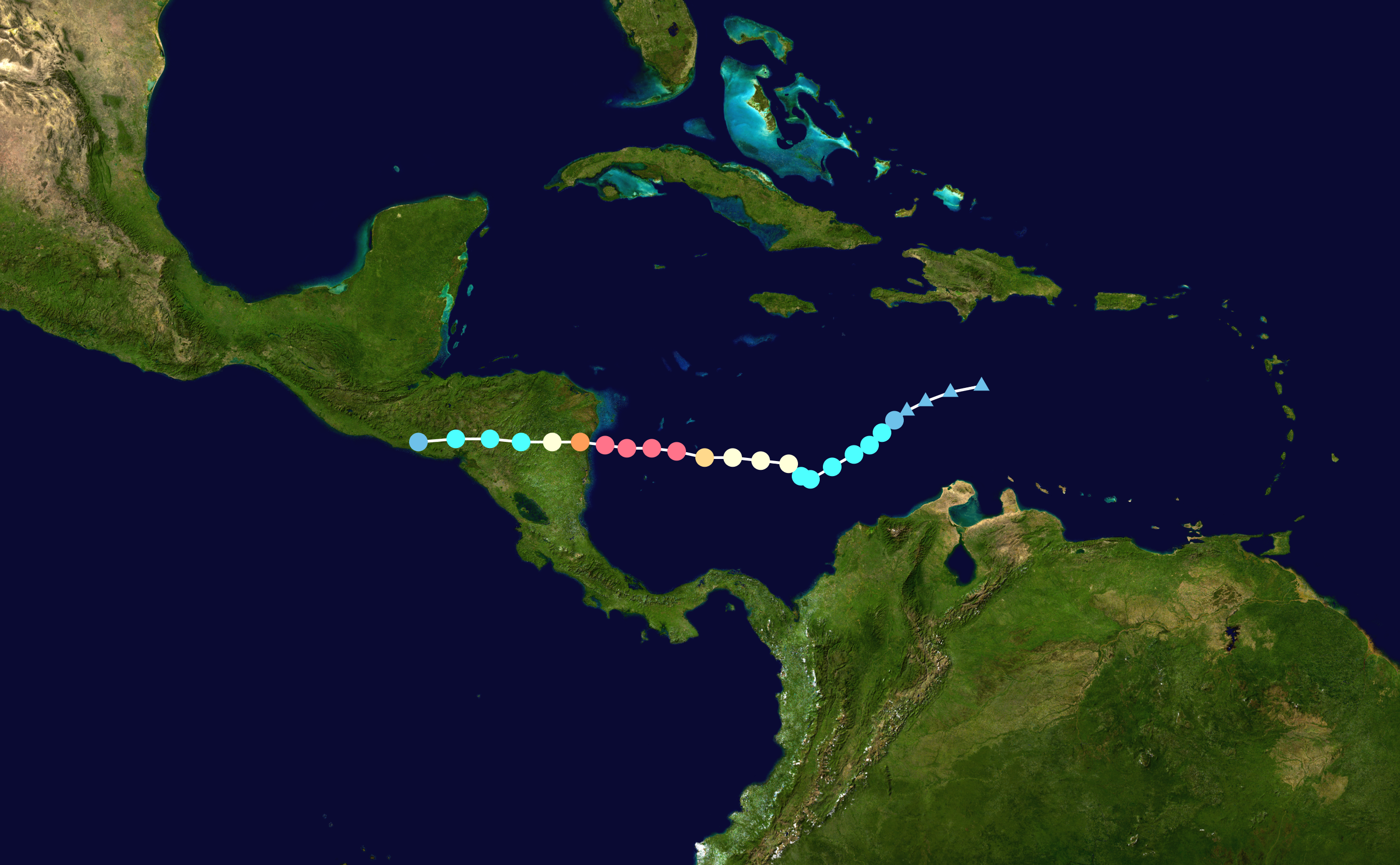
Map plotting the storm's track and intensity, according to the Saffir–Simpson scale Map key Saffir–Simpson scale Tropical depression (≤38 mph, ≤62 km/h) Tropical storm (39–73 mph, 63–118 km/h) Category 1 (74–95 mph, 119–153 km/h) Category 2 (96–110 mph, 154–177 km/h) Category 3 (111–129 mph, 178–208 km/h) Category 4 (130–156 mph, 209–251 km/h) Category 5 (≥157 mph, ≥252 km/h) Unknown Storm type Tropical cyclone Subtropical cyclone Extratropical cyclone, remnant low, tropical disturbance, or monsoon depression

On October 30, a low-latitude tropical wave exited the coast of West Africa over the Atlantic Ocean. Disorganized convection east of the wave axis accompanied the wave as it moved west over open waters. During November 7–8, the wave turned northwest and traversed northern South America, crossing Guyana, Venezuela, and the Windward Islands before emerging over the Caribbean Sea. Largely favorable environmental conditions ahead of the disturbance led to the National Hurricane Center (NHC) issuing outlooks for potential cyclogenesis at this time. Turning back to the west and slowing, interaction with an upper-level trough fostered the development and expansion of convection. Strong wind shear inhibited organization as the system approached Hispaniola on November 10–11; however, the system made an unusual turn southwest in response to a mid-level ridge over the southwestern Atlantic and a surface low developed by 12:00 UTC on November 12. Lessening wind shear in this region enabled convection to concentrate around the center of the low and the system became a tropical depression on November 13, the record-tying thirty-first of the season, approximately 185 mi (298 km) northwest of Aruba. The depression strengthened into Tropical Storm Iota six hours later, bolstering the already record-breaking number of named storms during the 2020 season to 30.

Throughout the day, minimal intensification occurred due to vertical wind shear as Iota remained a broad system with its surface- and mid-level circulations disjointed. Large-scale environmental conditions consisting of sea surface temperatures of 84 °F (29 °C) and ample low- to mid-level moisture favored significant intensification of the cyclone. However, unexpected localized moderate shear and Iota's proximity to Colombia kept the cyclone disorganized. As Iota moved farther from land on November 14, banding features became more pronounced and deep convection blossomed over a tightening circulation. With Iota becoming more compact and organized within the aforementioned favorable conditions and shear relaxing, the system underwent an exceptional period of explosive intensification (Note: The National Hurricane Center defines explosive intensification as a pressure drop of 42 mbar (1.2 inHg) or greater within a 24-hour period.) from 18:00 UTC on November 14 to 12:00 UTC on November 16. The environment surrounding Iota was ideal for this to occur: wind shear fell below 5 mph (8 km/h), lower- to mid-level relative humidity values exceeded 70 percent, and sea surface temperatures averaged 84–86 °F (29–30 °C). A symmetrical central dense overcast with temperatures averaging −112 °F (−80 °C) and broad outflow developed on November 15. Data from the 53rd Weather Reconnaissance Squadron revealed Iota to have become a hurricane by 06:00 UTC that day, the 14th such storm of the season. This was the second-highest number of hurricanes in a single season since reliable records began, just shy of the 15 in 2005. (Note: Operationally, Iota was considered the 13th hurricane of the season; however, this was amended to 14th following the post-analysis upgrade of October's Hurricane Gamma in April 2021.) Iota's core wobbled northwest at the onset of this intensification as the overall trajectory shifted west in response to a strengthening ridge spanning from the western Atlantic to the Gulf of Mexico. A ragged eye formed throughout the latter part of November 15 as the system became co-located with an upper-level anticyclone.

A satellite animation of Hurricane Iota reaching its peak strength on November 16 as it struck Providencia and Santa Catalina

The most rapid phase of intensification occurred early on November 16, during which recorded a six-hour pressure drop of 26 mbar (0.77 inHg), including a drop of 10 mbar (0.30 inHg) in a single hour, was observed by aircraft reconnaissance. The 15-mile-wide (24 km) eye featured six mesovortices, intense eyewall lightning, and hail. Though not fully understood, hypotheses at the time proposed that eyewall mesovortices can create intense hot towers with strong updrafts capable of more efficiently transporting mass out of the eye. This in turn hastens the rate of intensification. The mesovortices later degraded into a single, intense cell that remained in the southern eyewall through Iota's landfall in Nicaragua. Between 00:00 and 06:00 UTC, Iota became a major hurricane, the record-tying seventh instance of the season, (Note: Operationally, Iota was considered the sixth major hurricane of the season; however, this was amended to seventh following the post-analysis upgrade of October's Hurricane Zeta in May 2021.) and reached Category 4 intensity by 06:00 UTC. Around 10:45 UTC, the center of Iota passed less than 5 miles (8 km) north of Providencia and Santa Catalina and its eyewall struck the islands directly. It was estimated that the islands experienced sustained winds of at least 130 mph (210 km/h). The hurricane's exceptional intensification ended at 12:00 UTC on November 16 with it acquiring maximum sustained winds of 155 mph (250 km/h) and a minimum pressure of 917 mbar (27.08 inHg). This made Iota the second-most intense November hurricane on record, only behind the 1932 Cuba hurricane, as well the second-most intense hurricane in terms of pressure to peak at Category 4 strength, behind Hurricane Opal's 916 mbar. Iota's intensification was one of the fastest on record in the Atlantic basin. During a 42-hour period from 18:00 UTC on November 14 to 12:00 UTC on November 16, its central pressure fell by 80 mbar (2.36 inHg) and its maximum sustained winds rose by 105 mph (170 km/h). The pressure drop in this time span was the fourth-greatest on record, only behind Rita (93 mbar (2.75 inHg)) and Wilma (105 mbar (3.10 inHg)) in 2005 and Milton in 2024 (108 mbar (3.19 inHg)).

A satellite animation of Hurricane Iota weakening as it moved inland over Nicaragua on November 17

After reaching its peak strength on November 16, Iota slowly weakened on approach to Nicaragua. Lower sea surface temperatures and ocean heat content, likely the result of upwelling from Hurricane Eta, caused convection to diminish and its eye structure to deteriorate. Around 03:40 UTC on November 17, Iota made landfall near the small village of Haulover, Nicaragua – approximately 25 mi (40 km) south-southwest of Bilwi – with estimated winds of 145 mph (235 km/h). This was only 14 mi (23 km) south of where Hurricane Eta made landfall at a similar intensity two weeks prior. In the hours leading up to the hurricane's landfall on November 17, there were no reconnaissance missions and Iota's intensity was uncertain. Furthermore, land-based measurements were nearly non-existent given the devastation wrought by Eta. An unofficial gust of 124 mph (200 km/h) was reported in southern Bilwi two hours prior to landfall while the highest reliable observations at Puerto Cabezas Airport had sustained winds of 83 mph (134 km/h) and peak gusts of 113 mph (182 km/h).

Once inland, Iota rapidly weakened over the mountainous terrain of Nicaragua and Honduras. Convection dramatically warmed, though the hurricane maintained a small core several hours after landfall. Based on calculations using the SHIPS inland decay model, Iota was estimated to have weakened into a tropical storm by 18:00 UTC near the Nicaragua–Honduras border. By the start of November 18, the remaining deep convection was confined to a rainband well to the northwest of the storm's core. Scatterometer data indicate the system continued producing tropical storm-force winds off the northern coast of Honduras throughout the morning. After weakening to a tropical depression by 12:00 UTC, the surface circulation of Iota dissipated over east-central El Salvador several hours later; however, its mid-level remnant continued west and soon connected to a monsoon trough. The system was last noted the following day well to the southwest of Guatemala.

=== Peak intensity analysis ===
Operationally, Iota was classified as a Category 5 hurricane with maximum sustained winds of 160 mph (255 km/h) based on stepped-frequency microwave radiometer (SFMR) measurements of 165 mph (266 km/h) and aircraft flight-level winds of 169 mph (272 km/h). This would have made it the latest such storm during a calendar year on record in the basin and the only Category 5 hurricane of the season. However, after post-season analysis, the NHC determined the SFMR values to have a high bias as the highest observations were coupled with lower flight-level winds, a problem that had recently been discovered with other intense hurricanes. The peak SFMR value was co-located with flight-level winds of 148 mph (238 km/h), which would typically reduce to 133 mph (214 km/h) at the surface using flight-level to surface reductions. NHC meteorologists determined that breaking waves along the west side of Providencia and Santa Catalina interfered with the instrument's measurement quality. Accordingly, the peak intensity was revised downward to 155 mph (250 km/h), downgrading Iota to a Category 4 hurricane; however, this was within the normal range of uncertainty. Meteorologists noted that research into these errors was ongoing and the peak intensity of Iota could be revised in future analyses.

== Preparations ==
Tropical storm warnings were first issued for the Colombian islands of San Andrés and Providencia around midday on November 14. Three hours later, a hurricane watch was issued for Providencia, as well as along the coast of Northern Nicaragua and Eastern Honduras, with a tropical storm watch also issued for Central Honduras. All of the watches were eventually upgraded to warnings, with an additional hurricane watch for San Andrés as well as a tropical storm warning for south central Nicaragua. The rest of the coastline of Honduras, as well as the Bay Islands, were later put under tropical storm warnings on November 16.

Oxfam had to temporarily suspend operations across Nicaragua, Honduras, Guatemala, and El Salvador related to Hurricane Eta to protect relief works.

=== Nicaragua ===
With Nicaragua still reeling from Hurricane Eta two weeks prior, many areas remained flooded. Towns around Puerto Cabezas in particular were devastated by Eta and debris remained strewn across the area. The International Federation of Red Cross and Red Crescent Societies emphasized the risk of widespread flooding and landslides as soils were completely saturated. The Government of Nicaragua opened 600 shelters and 63,000 people evacuated nationwide. Some residents feared starvation while residing in shelters as Eta largely destroyed the region's crops. The government of Taiwan donated 800 tons of rice to the areas expected to be impacted by the storm.

=== Honduras ===
Approximately 80,000 people were evacuated from flood-prone areas. An estimated 100,000 people remained isolated across Honduras in the aftermath of Hurricane Eta as Iota made landfall.

=== El Salvador ===
The Government of El Salvador opened 1,000 shelters with a capacity for 30,000 people. By November 17 700 people had relocated from their homes.

== Impact ==
Deaths and damage by territory
Country/Territory	Fatalities	Missing	Damage (2020 USD)	Refs
Colombia	10	8	$100 million	
Costa Rica	0	0	$16.5 million	
El Salvador	2	0	Unknown	
Guatemala	2	2	Unknown	
Honduras	13	1	Unknown	
Mexico	0	0	Unknown	
Nicaragua	39	29	$564 million	
Panama	1	1	Unknown	
Venezuela	0	0	Unknown	
Totals:	84	41	$1.4 billion	

Total damage from the storm was estimated at US$1.4 billion.

=== Venezuela ===
The precursor tropical wave to Iota produced heavy rain across Venezuela's Falcón state, primarily in the Paraguaná Peninsula. In the Silva municipality, flooding affected 288 homes. Damage to homes was reported in El Cayude and El Tranquero. The community of Santa Ana lost electrical service. Civil Protection officials advised residents of possible flooding along the Matícora reservoir in Mauroa, the Barrancas river, and the Quebrada de Uca river. Some flooding occurred in the state of Miranda.

=== Colombia ===
==== Mainland ====
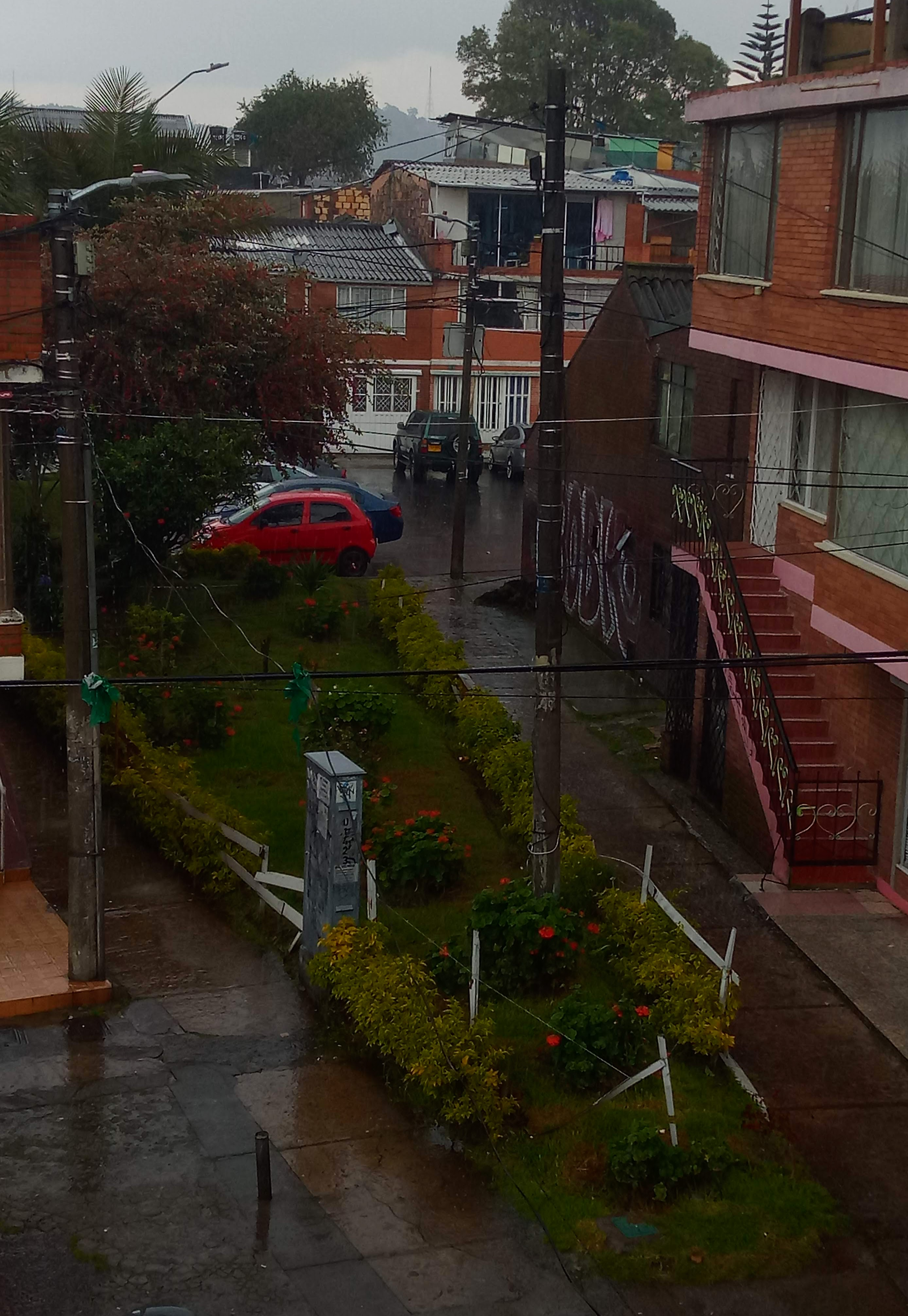
Rain from Iota in Bogotá, the capital city of Colombia

Heavy rains associated with a tropical wave and Iota caused extensive damage in Colombia. The worst damage took place in the Mohán sector of Dabeiba where landslides killed three people, injured 20, and left eight others missing. Eight people were rescued from the rubble. The landslides destroyed 67 homes and damaged 104 others as well as three schools. A total of 497 people were affected in the community. Approximately 100 vehicles were trapped by rockfalls along a road between Dabeiba and Urabá. Flooding affected 10 municipalities within the Chocó Department; the town of Lloró was isolated after the only bridge to the community collapsed. A landslide in Carmen de Atrato killed one person when his home was buried. Across Chocó, an estimated 28,000 people were affected. A van with two occupants disappeared when a landslide dragged the vehicle into the Atrato River. Emergencies were declared for 29 municipalities in the Santander Department where multiple rivers topped their banks. Several families were evacuated from Cimitarra due to rising water along the Carare River. A bridge collapse along the Chicamocha River isolated approximately 1,000 people in Carcasí and Enciso. More than 1,000 homes were damaged in the Atlántico Department: 693 in Malambo, 200 in Candelaria, and 150 in Carreto.

An estimated 70 percent of Cartagena saw flooding due to the direct effects of Iota, affecting an estimated 155,000 people. Numerous homes were damaged or destroyed by floods and landslides. Two people died in the San Pedro neighborhood when the motorcycle they were riding was swept into a canal. City officials converted the Coliseo de Combate into a shelter capable of accommodating 200 people.

==== Providencia and San Andrés ====
On November 15–16, Iota passed close to the outlying Archipelago of San Andrés, Providencia and Santa Catalina as a high-end Category 4 hurricane. The center of the hurricane's eye was 11 miles (18 km) from Providencia, but the storm still made a direct hit (rather than a landfall) on the island, causing damage described as "unprecedented" by President Iván Duque Márquez. Communication with the island lost on November 16 and lasted for over 20 hours. An estimated 98–99% of structures on the island were damaged or destroyed. Every home on the island suffered damage, with 80 percent being destroyed. One person was killed and six were injured on the island. Two shelters were known to have lost their roof before communication was lost. The situation on the island was difficult to ascertain as of November 17, though the island's hospital was assumed destroyed or rendered inoperable. Although debris covered runways at El Embrujo Airport, initially preventing aircraft from arriving or leaving, by November 17 it was operational enough to allow President Duque to visit and assess the damage of the island.

On San Andrés, torrential rains and large swells caused extensive flooding. Seawater rose up to 10 ft (3 m). Powerful winds uprooted numerous trees, some of which fell on homes, and several homes lost their roof. Communications with San Andrés were temporarily lost during the storm and approximately 60 percent of the island lost power. Flooding reached a depth of 6 in (15 cm) at Gustavo Rojas Pinilla International Airport, preventing usage of the runways. One person was killed on the island.

=== Central America ===
==== Nicaragua ====
Nearly 44,000 homes suffered total or partial damage in Nicaragua, said Nicaraguan Finance Minister Iván Acosta, who estimated that the storms have cost the country US$743 million in losses, according to the government media site El 19.

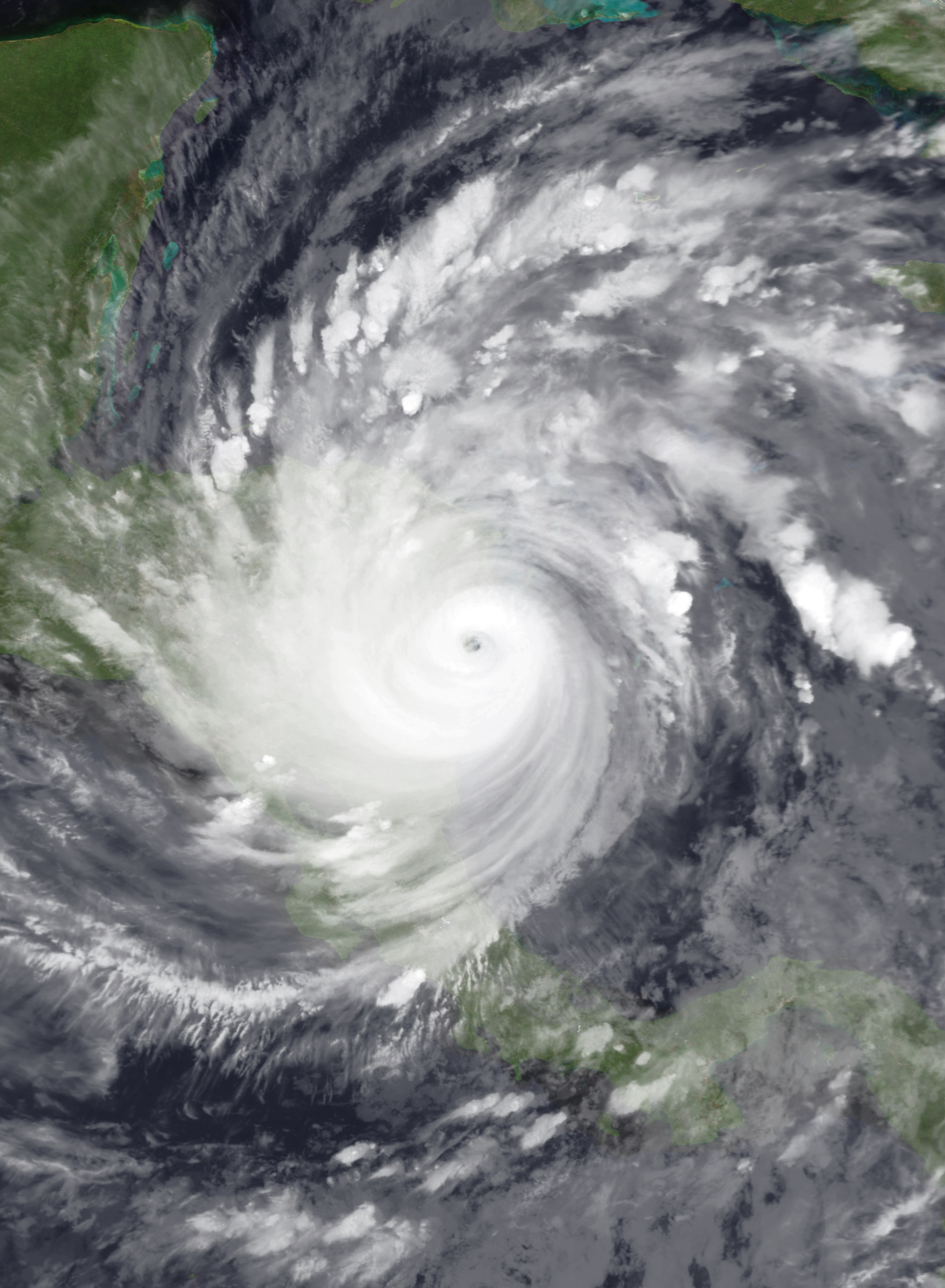
Hurricane Iota shortly after landfall south of Puerto Cabezas, Nicaragua

Iota made landfall in Nicaragua as a mid-end Category 4 hurricane near the town of Haulover, just south of Puerto Cabezas, on November 16, only 15 miles (24 km) south of where Hurricane Eta made landfall 13 days prior. As Iota was moving ashore, Puerto Cabezas airport reported sustained winds of 83 mph (134 km/h) with gusts to 113 mph (182 km/h) at 02:53 UTC on November 17. Damage reports, however, were extremely limited due to damage the area sustained previously from Hurricane Eta. These reports were also limited due to most communications to Puerto Cabezas being knocked out during the storm. An amateur radio from the Club de Radio-Experimentadores de Nicaragua (CREN) reported winds of 124 mph (200 km/h) and damaged roofs, although it was unclear whether these were sustained winds or wind gusts. The roof was torn off of a makeshift hospital that was serving as a replacement to an older hospital, requiring an evacuation of the patients there.

A total of 160,233 homes lost power in Nicaragua and 47,638 families lost water service. The Instituto Nicaragüense de Telecomunicaciones y Correos|es reported loss of telephone service to 35 communities. Torrential rains on already saturated soils led to extensive flooding and landslides. A storm surge of at least 26 feet (8 m) occurred near the town of Haulover and further north near the community of Wawa Bar. At least 28 people died in relation to the hurricane while 29 others went missing. Two children were swept away by a river in Santa Teresa, Carazo, while three other members of their family went missing; a sixth family member was rescued. A landslide killed two people in Wiwilí de Jinotega and another person died in Quilalí. In Wiwilí, fears arose over the safety of residents who evacuated into the mountains to escape flooding as numerous landslides occurred in the region. On November 17, at least 30 people were buried in a landslide in Macizo de Penas Blancas, and a boy was found buried. The next day, four more bodies were recovered, including one of a baby. On November 23, a passenger truck plunged off a road in a mountainous area that had been devastated by Iota, an accident which caused 17 fatalities and 25 injuries. Total damage was estimated at 12.3 billion córdobas (US$352.5 million).

==== Honduras ====
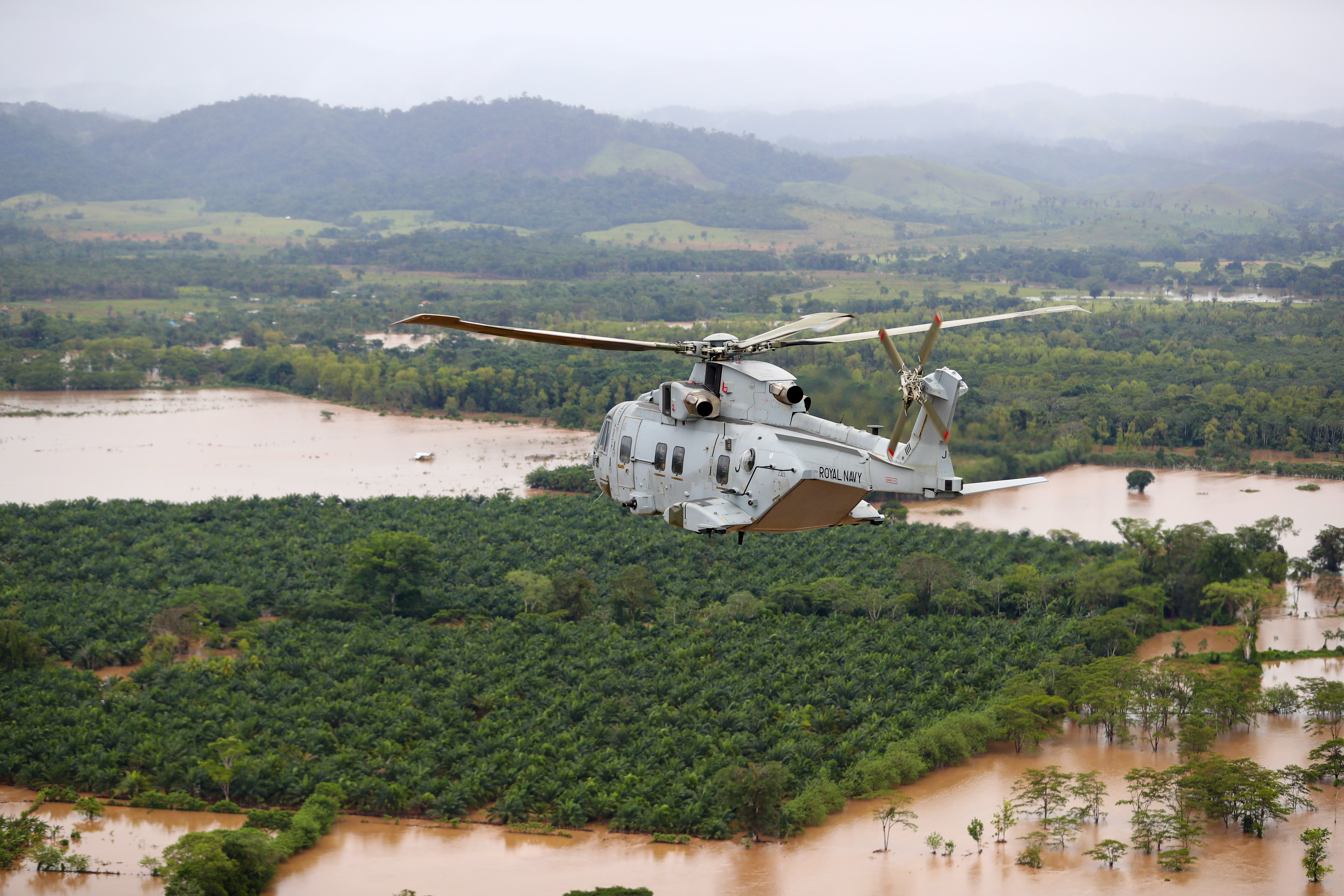
British Merlin helicopter on damage survey over Honduras

Together, Hurricanes Eta and Iota killed around 100 Hondurans, and local analysts estimated the damage would cost the country more than 10 billion dollars (L244.1 billion).

Iota produced heavy rainfall over portions of Honduras, causing a river to overflow in Tocoa. Mudslides and uprooted trees were also reported in portions of the country. La Ceiba, Honduras reported gusts of 58 mph (93 km/h). At least 16 people have died and one other have gone missing as a result of impacts from Iota in Honduras. Landslides were the primary cause of fatalities; one in San Manuel Colohete killed eight people and another in Los Trapiches killed five people. Teonela Paisano Wood, the mayor of Brus Laguna, stated concerns that continued rainfall pose a large threat to the town. Various concrete and wooden houses were reduced to rubble. As of the morning of November 18, COPECO reported 366,123 people were directly affected by the hurricane; 80% of Copán Ruinas' roads were rendered impassible due to mudslides and flash flooding. The Ramón Villeda Morales International Airport was expected to be remained closed until mid-December. The passenger terminal sustained extensive damage, and repairs were projected to take longer than a month.

=== Elsewhere ===
Officials in Panama said one person was killed in Nole Duima in the Ngäbe-Buglé Comarca. Another person was missing in Soloy, also in the region. In Mexico, the states of Chiapas, Tabasco, and Veracruz all experienced effects from Iota's rainfall. Cumulative total across the three states were nearly 297,000 affected people, as well as almost 59,000 homes being damaged. Blocked roads cut off access to 135 communities.

== Aftermath ==
The spread of disease, ranging from colds and skin rashes to gastrointestinal problems, became much more common. Other illnesses, such as dengue fever and COVID-19, had increased infection rates as well. Some refugees refused to be tested for COVID due to fears of being refused shelter due to infection. People in need of medication faced shortages and were often not able to acquire them.

=== Colombia ===
Following restoration of communication with Providencia on November 16, President Duque pledged immediate aid to the island. A state of emergency was declared for a year. Rough seas on November 17 prevented the Colombian Navy from reaching the island, though Duque was able to fly by helicopter for an aerial survey. Two field hospitals and 4,000 tents were to be set up on the island. Emphasis was placed on evacuating critical injuries to the mainland before establishing the field hospitals. By November 19, 112 people were airlifted from the island. The Colombian military deployed engineers and 15 tons of food. Duque stated that a plan for the complete reconstruction of Providencia's infrastructure was to be drawn up within 100 days and that all of the destroyed housing would be rebuilt by 2022. Duque pledged 150 billion pesos (US$41 million) for infrastructure repair. The relative lack of casualties in Providencia was attributed to residents adhering to warnings and seeking refuge in sturdy structures or interior bathrooms. Opposition to Duque criticized him for not evacuating Providencia ahead of the storm. On November 18, the Government of Colombia pledged 500 billion pesos (US$136 million) for recovery efforts in Bolívar and Cartagena.

=== Nicaragua ===
Nicaragua's power company, Enatrel, dispatched more than 100 crews to the Caribbean Coast to restore electricity. By November 17, nearly half of the outages were restored.

Operation USA began preparations for relief efforts on November 17. Nicaragua's army had sent 100 rescuers to a site where a landslide caused damage. Downed trees blocking the road hampered the effort. About 1,000 food kits would be delivered, as well as recreational activities for sheltered children. The food kits would be available until the government was able to provide adequate food support. 1,000 hygiene kits, which include laundry soap, hand and dish soap, bleach, and toilet paper will be given. Families will also receive purified water, face masks, blankets, buckets, plastic sheets, eggs and beef (the last two for preferred protein sources).

=== Honduras ===
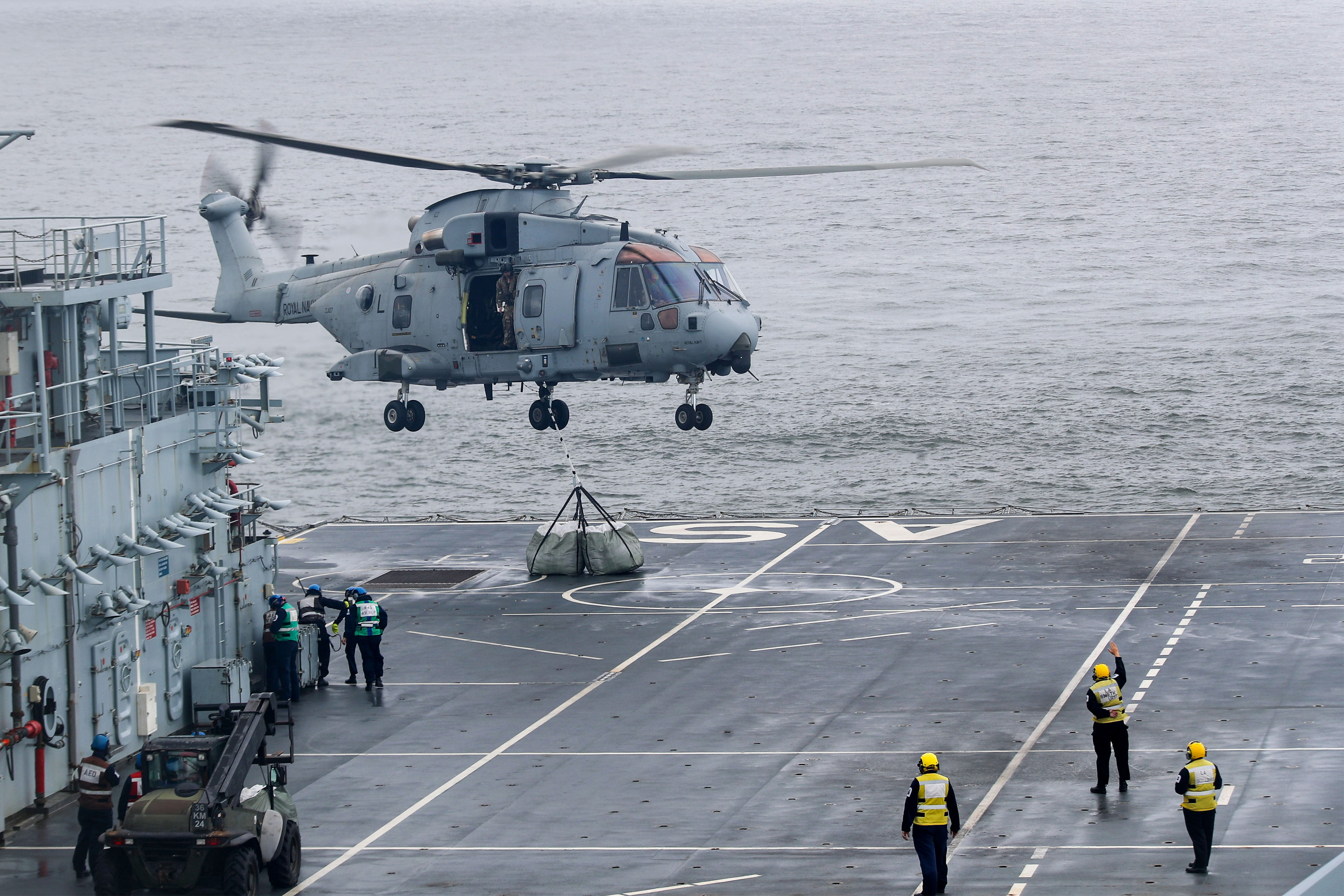
British Merlin helicopter takes off from RFA Argus with disaster relief supplies

As of November 25, 2.5 million people had limited or no access to health services due to impacts. Officials have reported that more than 4 million people have been affected by Eta and Iota. Project HOPE has given shipments of Personal protective equipment, 50,000 masks, as well as items for the WASH project. Approximately 185,000 people have been displaced. Additionally, ten health facilities reported the complete loss of cold chain equipment, hampering preparations for the distribution of COVID-19 vaccines.

== Retirement ==
Due to the extensive damage and loss of life brought by the hurricane in Central America, the Greek letter Iota, from the auxiliary storm name list, was retired by the World Meteorological Organization (WMO) in March 2021, and will never be used again for an Atlantic tropical cyclone. The WMO also decided to discontinue the use of the Greek alphabet auxiliary list, and replaced it with a new 21-name supplemental list for use when a regular naming list is exhausted.

== See also ==
- Tropical cyclones in 2020
- List of Category 4 Atlantic hurricanes
- List of costliest Atlantic hurricanes
- List of Nicaragua hurricanes
