= Macaravita =

Coordinates: 6°30′N 72°36′W

- Municipality and town
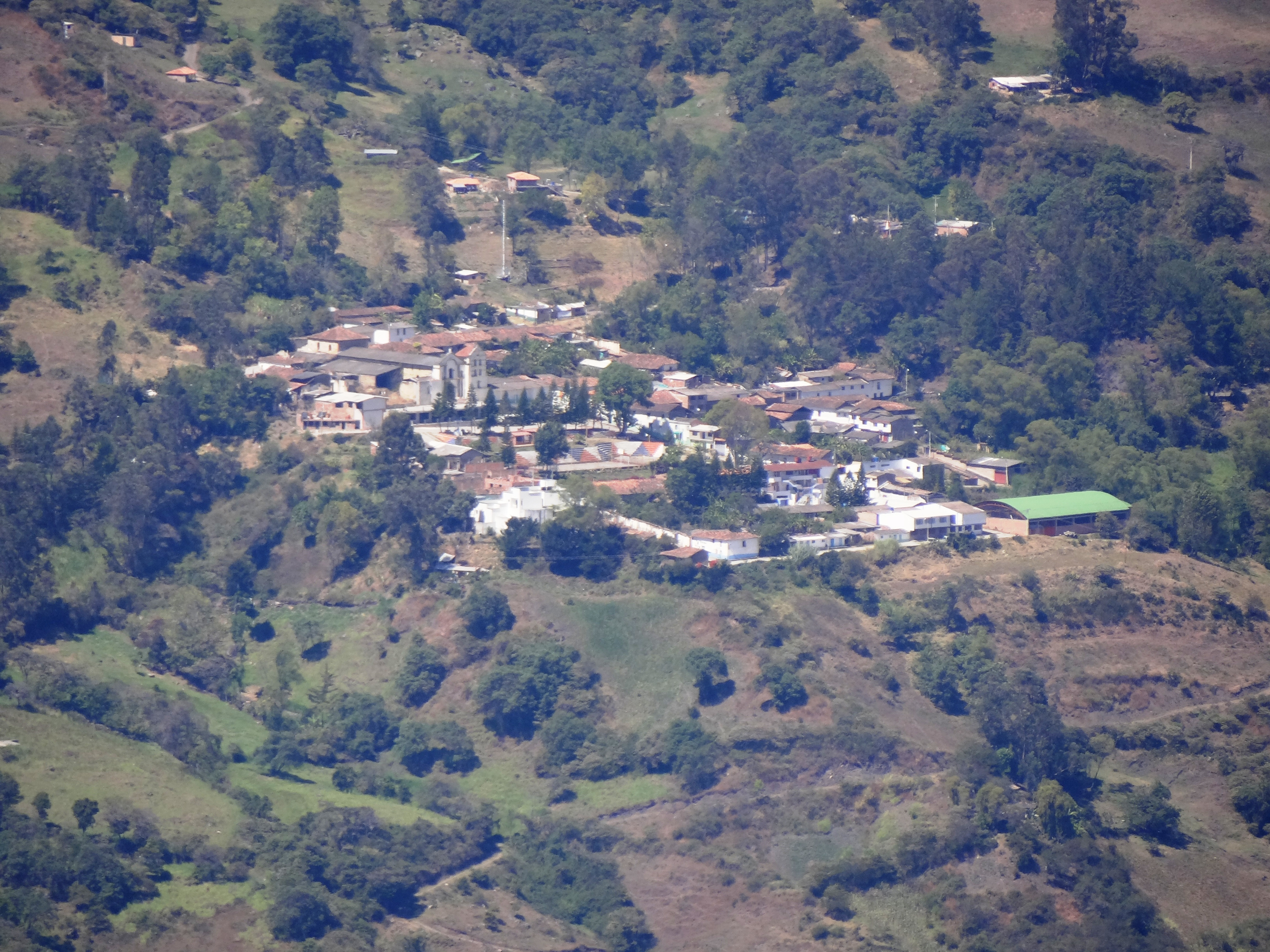

- Flag

- Location of the municipality and town of Macaravita in the Santander Department of Colombia.
- Country: Colombia
- Department: Santander Department
- Time zone: UTC-5 (Colombia Standard Time)

Macaravita is a municipality in the province of García Rovira within the Santander Department in northeastern Colombia.

== History ==
The municipality of Macaravita was founded on 22 December, 1857 by Hernán Pérez de Estrada.

Before the Spanish conquest, the territory of Macaravita was inhabited by indigenous people of the Tuneba or Lache ethnic group.

== Geography ==
Macaravita is located in the southeast of the province of García Rovira, east of the department of Santander.

It borders the municipality of Carcasí to the north; Chiscas and El Espino of the department of Boyacáto the east; Boavita and Guacamayas of the department of Boyacá to the south; and Capitanejo to the west.
