= Laches =

Laches may refer to:

- Laches (equity), an equitable principle in Anglo-American law
- Laches (general) (c. 475 – 418 BC), an Athenian aristocrat
- Laches (dialogue), a Socratic dialogue of Plato
- Laches, Bogotá, a neighbourhood (barrio) in Bogotá, Colombia
- Laches, the Lache people

== See also ==
- Lache (disambiguation)
- Lachesis (mythology), the Fate who determined the length of the thread of life
- Lachesis (genus), the bushmaster pit viper
- Lachesis or 120 Lachesis, C-type asteroid between Mars and Jupiter
