= Mascarita =

Mascarita is a given name. Notable people with the name include:

- Mascarita Divina (born 1983), the ring name of a Mexican Luchador enmascarado, or masked professional wrestler
- Mascarita Dorada (born 1982), the ring name of a Mexican Luchador enmascarado, or masked professional wrestler
- Mascarita Magica or Fire (wrestler) (born 1973), Mexican luchador, or professional wrestler
- Mascarita Sagrada (born 1965), Mexican Mini Luchador enmascarado (Spanish for Midget Masked wrestler)
- Mascarita Sagrada (2007), Mexican Luchador enmascarado, or masked professional wrestler

== See also ==
- Macaravita
- Masaki Orita
- Mascara
- Mascarenhia
