= Dario Ortiz =

Dario Ortiz may refer to:

- Dario Ortiz (artist) (born 1968), Colombian artist
- Darío Ortiz (footballer) (born 1967), Argentine footballer
