= San Andrés, Colombia =

San Andrés, Colombia, may refer to:

- San Andrés Island, an island of Colombia
- San Andrés, San Andrés y Providencia, capital city of San Andrés Island, Colombia
- San Andrés de Cuerquia, a town in Antioquia Department, Colombia
- San Andrés, Santander, a town in Santander Department, Colombia
