= Nicaragua and the International Monetary Fund =

Nicaragua joined the International Monetary Fund (IMF) on March 14, 1946, and to date has made 18 arrangements with the IMF. Its current quota is 260 million in Special Drawing Rights (SDR).

== History of IMF - Nicaragua Relations ==
=== 1990's Arrangements ===
In 1990, in the wake of the Contra War, the economy was declining because of production plummeting by more than 5 percent, GDP falling below levels seen 40 years prior, and with inflation above 13,000 percent as well as a destabilized nation due to the uncertainty of the political leadership . 1990 was also the year of elections in which Violeta Chamorra won against previous president Daniel Ortega, upsetting many in the Sandinistas and leading to country wide strikes among Sandinista public employees. Shortly after, Sandinistas gave in having reached an agreement with the new government, though many of them left unfulfilled The next year, with continual decline in the economy, Nicaragua takes out a loan of a little over 17 million in SDR on September 23, 1991, and pays this amount off between 1994 and 1996.

In 1994, Nicaragua acquires a loan of 20 million immediately from the IMF under the Poverty Reduction and Growth Trust, which sets conditions for improving growth in the nation and reducing poverty. It was also reported this loan would go towards repaying debt from the world bank to reduce inflation numbers. This bread controversy as the fund pleaded for the money to be used to increase GDP of the country rather than its outstanding debts.

In 1998, Nicaragua petitions for a loan of 100 million in SDR across 3 years with the goal of eliminating poverty while simultaneously creating financial institutions to further stimulate growth for economic stability. This loan is then approved on March 19, 1998. From 1998 to 2000, Nicaragua receives a net 109 million in SDR. In spite of a hurricane that struck Nicaragua, Nicaragua continued to grow in GDP with as much as 4 percent in 1998. This surge in economic development was also in part because of reconstruction efforts from the hurricane. The only major roadblock of the efforts was the hyper inflation of food products that rose as high as 18.5 percent in December 1998. In a report done in 2001 by the IMF, it was found that people living in extreme poverty was reduced by 50,000 from 1998 to 2001.

=== 2000's Arrangements ===
In 2002, Nicaragua experienced a financial banking crisis as a result of investor instability in the wake of an election, leading to a massive deceleration of growth to 1 percent. Furthermore, the Central Bank of Nicaragua (BCN) had to take the majority of the damage and up spending dramatically, thus raising debt. Because of this, the IMF approves another loan of 129 million in SDR for economic stability.

In 2006, Nicaragua applied and was approved for a 111 Million loan by the IMF under the Poverty Reduction and Growth Fund and was required to follow the Poverty Reduction Strategy Paper (PRSP). This was in response to a survey conducted that saw increases in oil prices, high inflation rates, high public debt, as well as persisting poverty within Central America in 2004 to 2006. This would also go on to help in the 2008 international financial crisis with inflation rates going as high as 14 points. There was also a decline in the microfinance industry, having potential for further economic decline and in which the IMF pressured the Nicaragua government to rectify the issue with said loan.

=== 2010's Arrangements ===
Nicaragua from 2011 to 2019 paid all its debts without taking out further loans until 2020. Because of this development and the economic stability, the IMF left country in 2011, closing its local office in the nation.

== Modern Day and Pandemic ==
In early 2020, COVID-19 spread to Central America and specifically to Nicaragua, where the pandemic had impacts on the economy. Nicaragua was already facing economic decline before the onset of the pandemic and was predicted to stagger its economy to devastation. Despite this, poverty rates were starting to decrease from 40 percent in 2019 to 32 percent in 2020 when the pandemic started. The IMF provided 130 million of direct emergency funding to Nicaragua in wake of the COVID-19 Pandemic crisis as well as Hurricane Iota and to assist in economic stability of Nicaragua. Nicaragua has not made any outstanding payments since the disbursement of these funds and still has an outstanding balance of 130 million as of March 2022.
