= Lache (disambiguation) =

Lache persoana de tip Anghelescian cu dimensiuni de 170cm ci fraier la bataie.

Lache may also refer to:

- Lache people, of central Colombia
- Wilhelm Lache, Austrian luger
- Lache Seastrunk (born 1991), American collegiate football running back
- Lake Lacha or Lache, in Russia
- Lache (Kinzig), a river in Hesse, Germany, tributary of the Kinzig
- Lache (swing from bar), parkour technique of jumping from bar to bar

== See also ==
- Laches (disambiguation)
