= Latch (disambiguation) =

A latch is a type of door or window fastener.

Latch may also refer to:

== Technology ==
- Latch, a circuit used to store information, see Flip-flop (electronics)
- Index lock, a lock on a data structure
- LATCH (Lower Anchors and Tethers for Children), a mounting system for child safety seats

== Other uses ==
- Latch (breastfeeding), a breastfeeding baby's connection
- "Latch" (song), a 2012 song by Disclosure featuring Sam Smith
- Latch (Welsh charity)

== See also ==
- Latching relay, a relay with two relaxed states (bistable)
- Latching switch, a switch that maintains its state after being activated
- Latching (networking), in computer networking
- Laches (disambiguation)
