= Museo de Arte del Tolima =

Coordinates: 04°26′20″N 75°13′55″W

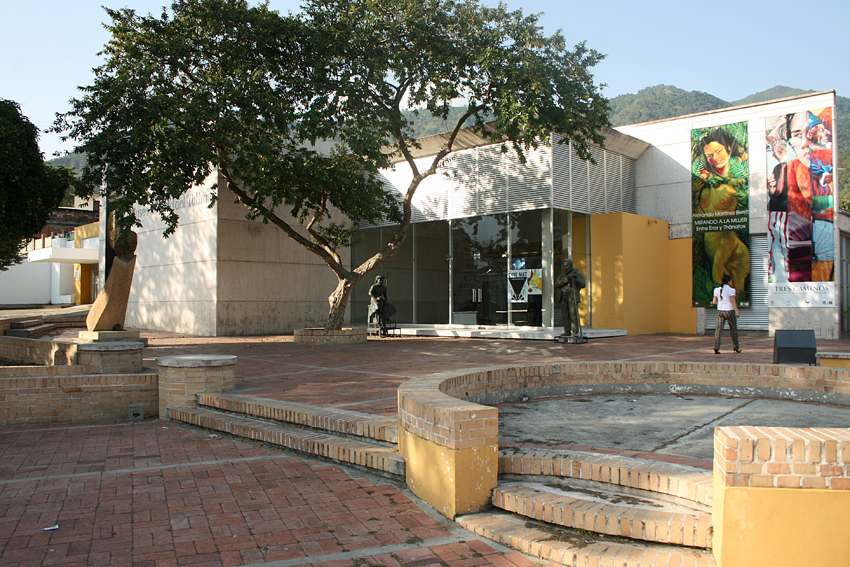
- Established: 2003
- Location: Carrera 7 No 5-93 B/Belen; Ibagué, Colombia
- Type: Colombian art and Latin American Contemporary Art
- President: Dario Ortiz
- Website: www.museodeartedeltolima.org

The Museo de Arte del Tolima (MAT) is an art museum located in Ibagué, capital of the Tolima Department of Colombia. It features pieces of Colombian art and contemporary Latin American art. The museum was founded by the artists Dario Ortiz, Julio Cesar Cuitiva, Margareth Bonilla Morales, and others and opened its doors to the public in December 2003. It offers a significant permanent collection as well as educational program and cultural programs to its visitors.

Works of the permanent collection include Epifanio Garay, Ricardo Acevedo Bernal, Jesús Rafael Soto, Carlos Cruz-Díez, Leonora Carrington, Alejandro Obregón, Fernando Botero, Édgar Negret, Julio Fajardo, Dario Ortiz, José Bedia, Ricardo Borrero Álvarez, José María Espinoza, Armando Villegas, pieces from Colombian and Latin American artists.
