= Santander Department =

Department of Colombia

Department of Santander Departamento de Santander
- Department
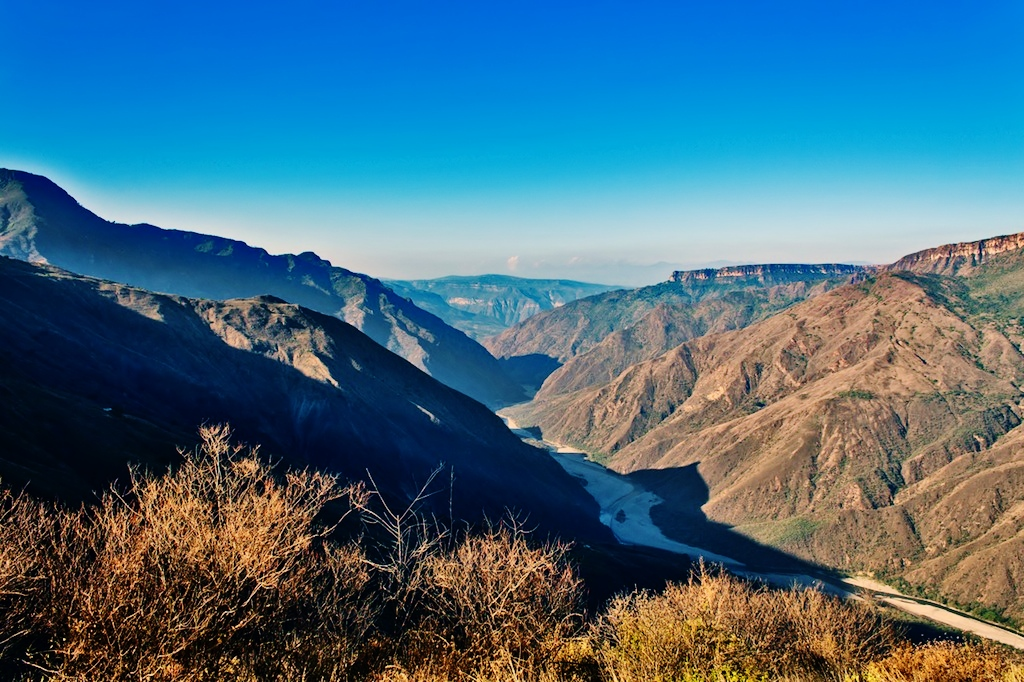
- The Chicamocha Canyon

- Flag Coat of arms
- Motto: Santandereanos siempre adelante (Spanish: People of Santander always ahead)
- Anthem: Himno de Santander
- Santander shown in red

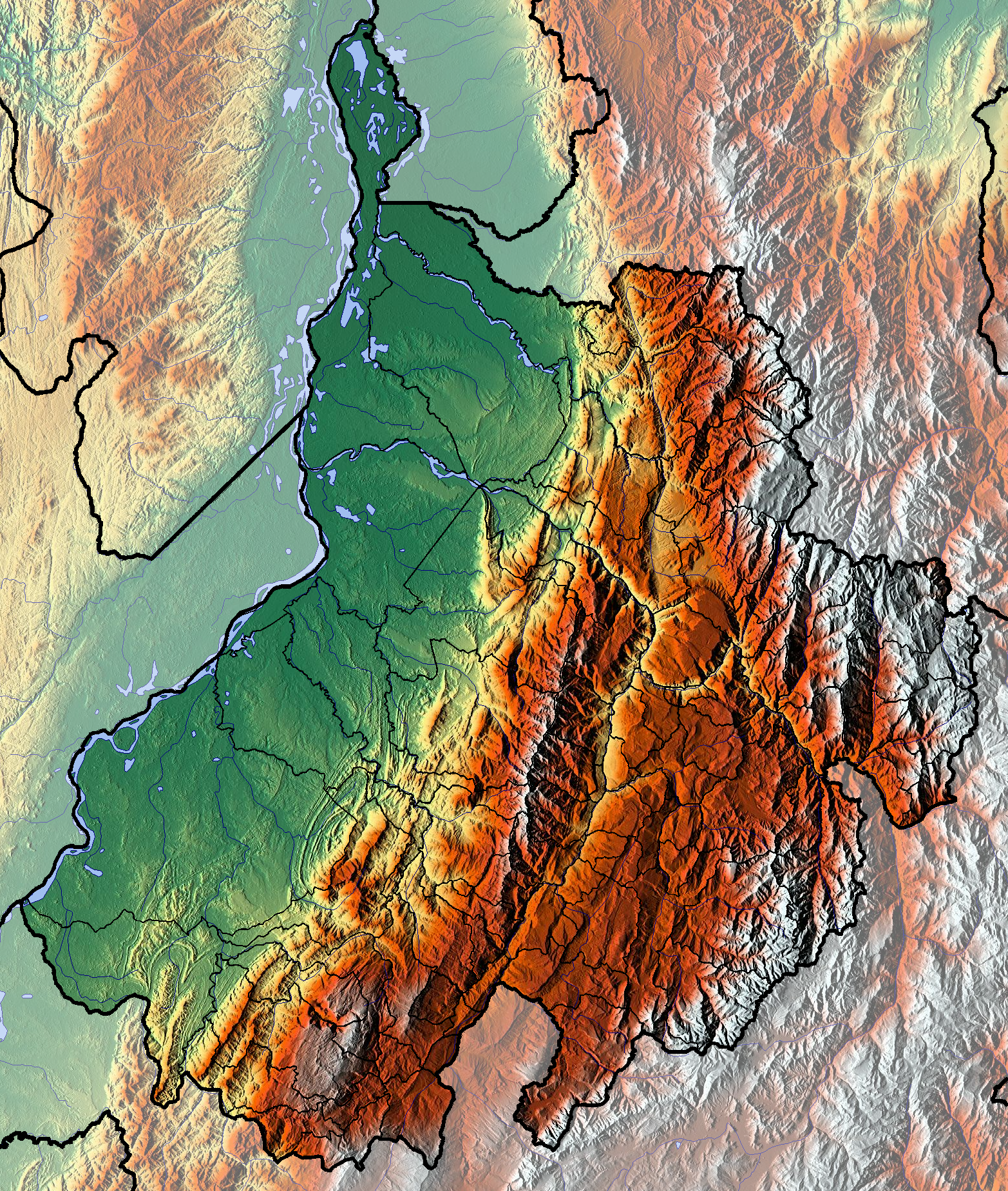
- Topography of the department
- Coordinates: 7°8′N 73°0′W
- Country: Colombia
- Region: Andean Region
- Established: May 13, 1857
- Capital: Bucaramanga
- Largest city: Bucaramanga

Government
  - Governor: Juvenal Díaz Mateus (2024-2028) (Liberal Party)

Area
  - Total: 30,537 km^{2} (11,790 sq mi)
  - Rank: 12th

Population (2018)
  - Total: 2,184,837
  - Rank: 6th
  - Density: 71.547/km^{2} (185.31/sq mi)
- Demonym: santandereano

GDP
  - Total: COP 92,277 billion (US$ 21.7 billion)
- Time zone: UTC-05
- ISO 3166 code: CO-SAN
- Provinces: 8
- Municipalities: 87
- HDI: 0.799 high · 6th of 33
- Website: gobernaciondesantander.gov.co

Santander (Spanish pronunciation: [santanˈdeɾ]) is a department of Colombia. It is located in the central northern part of the country, and borders the Magdalena River to the east, Boyacá to the south and southeast, Norte de Santander to the northeast, Cesar to the north, and the Bolivar and Antioquia Departments to the west. Its capital is the city of Bucaramanga.

Santander was one of the nine original states in the United States of Colombia. It is named after the Colombian hero of independence, Francisco de Paula Santander.

== History ==
=== Pre-Columbian era ===
Prior to the arrival of the Spaniards, the territory now known as Santander was inhabited by Amerindian ethnic groups: Muisca, Chitareros, Laches, Yariguí, Opón, Carare and Guanes.

Their political and social structure was based on cacicazgos, a federation of tribes led by a cacique, with different social classes. Their main activity was planting maize, beans, yuca, arracacha, cotton, agave, tobacco, tomato, pineapple and guava, among others. Their agricultural skills were sufficiently developed to take advantage of the different mountainous terrains. The Guanes utilized terraces and an artificial system of irrigation. They had a knowledge of arts and crafts based on ovens to produce ceramics. They had cotton to make clothing and accessories such as hats and bags.

=== Colonization ===
Spanish conqueror Antonio de Lebrija led the first expedition through the area in 1529. The area was later invaded c. 1532 by German Ambrosius Ehinger in a quest to find El Dorado. This disrupted or destroyed many of the Amerindian villages. Some ethnic groups like the Yariguíes, Opones, and Carares fought the conquerors until they became extinct. Explorer Gonzalo Jiménez de Quesada later went to the area in an effort to appease the tribes. The colonization process in the area was started by Martín Galeano who founded the village of Vélez on July 3, 1539 and Pedro de Ursúa and Ortún Velázquez de Velasco founded the village of Pamplona (now part of the Norte de Santander Department) in 1549.

Once the Amerindian tribes were dominated, the Spanish organized the territory based on Cabildos (councils) to maintain the dominance and administer justice in the conquered territory. Amerindians were assimilated and subject to the encomienda regime to work in agriculture, manufacturing goods, and mines. These two villages functioned as centers for the Cabildos' territories. In 1636 the Cabildo of Vélez was transferred to a new jurisdiction centered on the village of Girón, comprising from the Sogamoso River, and Río del Oro to the Magdalena River. The village of San Gil was created in 1689, segregated from the Jurisdiction of Vélez. In 1789 the village of Socorro was also segregated from Vélez and they were all put under the mandate of the Province of Tunja, a subdivision of the Viceroyalty of New Granada. On July 9, 1795 the corregimiento of Vélez – San Gil – Socorro was created due to the unsustainability of the Province of Tunja, and local government was established in the village of Socorro.

Historical population
| Year | Pop. | ±% |
|---|---|---|
| 1912 | 400,084 | — |
| 1938 | 615,710 | +53.9% |
| 1950 | 747,706 | +21.4% |
| 1964 | 1,001,213 | +33.9% |
| 1973 | 1,127,999 | +12.7% |
| 1985 | 1,511,392 | +34.0% |
| 1993 | 1,811,741 | +19.9% |
| 2005 | 1,957,789 | +8.1% |
| 2018 | 2,184,837 | +11.6% |

== Culture ==
The department's culture descends from a mix of Spanish and Chibcha influences, particularly in the south where the Muisca controlled territory and in the Chicamocha Canyon where the Guane And where the municipality of Jordan is also located, known locally for having around 200 inhabitants are situated. During the colony and independence war times, people from Santander were especially recognized for their bravery in battle and their policy of "not even a step back". Soldiers from Santander were valued and respected but also difficult to control as they were, in general, more politically aware than people from other regions and therefore prone to question orders and law.

Among the most outstanding and representative artists of the Santander Department is Oscar Rodríguez Naranjo.

== Notable people ==
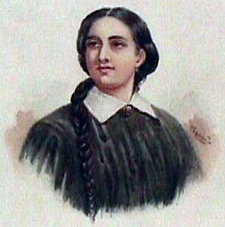
Antonia Santos

- Manuela Beltrán (1724–?), Neogranadine woman who organized a peasant revolt against excess taxation in 1780
- María Antonia Santos Plata (1782 in Pinchote – 1819 in Socorro, Santander), Neogranadine peasant, rebel leader and heroine
- Geo von Lengerke (1827−1882), German engineer, merchant and landowner
- Ofelia Uribe de Acosta (1900 in Oiba – 1988 in Bogotá), suffragist
- Oscar Rodríguez Naranjo (1907–2006), painter
- José de Jesús Pimiento Rodríguez (1919 in Zapatoca – 2019), Prelate of the Catholic Church
- Virginia Gutiérrez de Pineda (1921 in El Socorro, Santander – 1999 in Bogotá), anthropologist who pioneered work on Colombian family and medical anthropology
- Reiner Bredemeyer (1929 in Vélez, Santander – 1995), German composer
- Carlos Ardila Lülle (1930–2021, born in Bucaramanga), entrepreneur, founded Organización Ardila Lülle
- Carlos Prada Sanmiguel (1939–2013), Roman Catholic bishop
- Patricia Ariza (born 1948 in Vélez, Santander), poet, playwright and actor

== Administrative divisions ==
=== Provinces ===
The department is subdivided into provinces:

- Metropolitana Province
- North Soto Province
- Comunera Province
- Guanentá Province
- Vélez Province
- García Rovira Province
- Mares Province
- Carare-Opón Province

=== Municipalities ===
- Aguada
- Albania
- Aratoca
- Barbosa
- Barichara
- Barrancabermeja
- Betulia
- Bolívar
- Bucaramanga
- Cabrera
- California
- Capitanejo
- Carcasí
- Cepitá
- Cerrito
- Charalá
- Charta
- Chima
- Chipatá
- Cimitarra
- Concepción
- Confines
- Contratación
- Coromoro
- Curití
- El Carmen
- El Guacamayo
- El Peñón
- El Playón
- Encino
- Enciso
- Florián
- Floridablanca
- Galán
- Gámbita
- Girón
- Guaca
- Guadalupe
- Guapotá
- Guavatá
- Güepsa
- Hato
- Jesús María
- Jordán
- La Belleza
- Landázuri
- La Paz
- Lebrija
- Los Santos
- Macaravita
- Málaga
- Matanza
- Mogotes
- Molagavita
- Ocamonte
- Oiba
- Onzaga
- Palmar
- Palmas del Socorro
- Páramo
- Piedecuesta
- Pinchote
- Puente Nacional
- Puerto Parra
- Puerto Wilches
- Rionegro
- Sabana de Torres
- San Andrés
- San Benito
- San Gil
- San Joaquín
- San José de Miranda
- San Miguel
- Santa Bárbara
- Santa Helena del Opón
- San Vicente de Chucurí
- Simacota
- Socorro
- Suaita
- Sucre
- Suratá
- Tona
- Valle de San José
- Vélez
- Vetas
- Villanueva
- Zapatoca

== See also ==
- Postage stamps and postal history of Santander
