= Carare-Opón Province =

- Province
- Country: Colombia
- Department: Santander
- Time zone: UTC−05:00 (COT)

The Carare-Opón Province is a former province of the Colombian Department of Santander.
