= San Gil =

Coordinates: 6°33′33″N 73°8′6″W

- Municipality and town
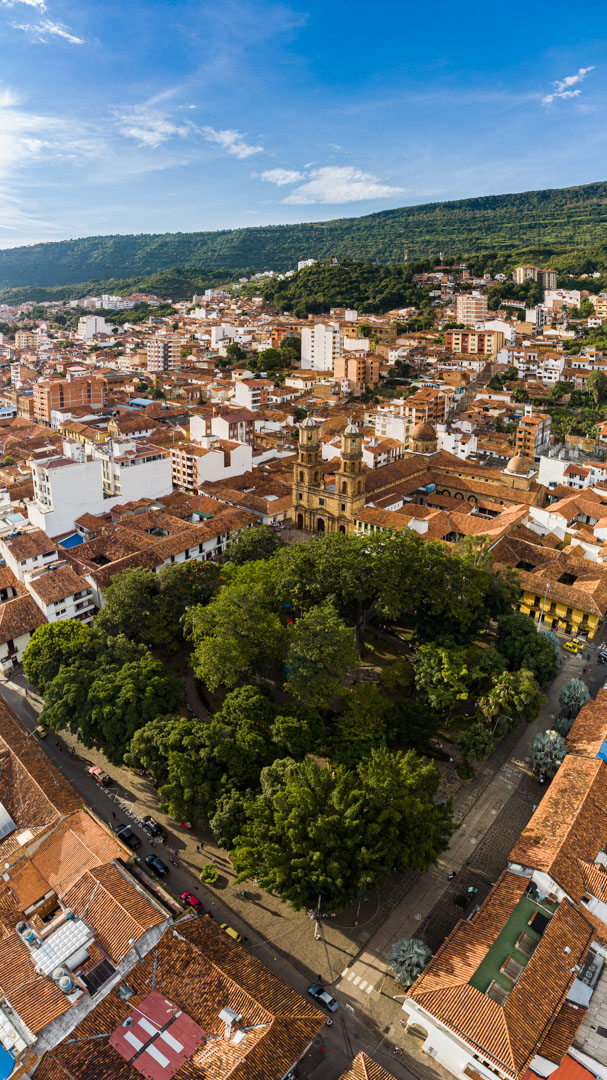
- View of San Gil

- Flag Coat of arms

- Location of the municipality and town of San Gil in the Santander Department of Colombia.
- Country: Colombia
- Department: Santander Department
- Founded: March 17, 1689
- Founder: Don Gil Cabrera y Dávalos & Leonardo Correa De Betancurt

Area
  - Municipality and town: 146.9 km^{2} (56.7 sq mi)
  - Urban: 7.33 km^{2} (2.83 sq mi)

Population (2020 estimate)
  - Municipality and town: 59,670
  - Density: 406.2/km^{2} (1,052/sq mi)
  - Urban: 51,874
  - Urban density: 7,080/km^{2} (18,300/sq mi)
- Demonym: Sangileño -a
- Time zone: UTC-5 (Colombia Standard Time)
- Website: www.sangil.gov.co

San Gil is a town and municipality in the Department of Santander in northeastern Colombia, located roughly 300 km (192 mi) from Bogotá and 95 km from the department's capital, Bucaramanga. As of 2020, San Gil had a population of 51,874 within the urban area, making it the third largest urban area in the department, after Bucaramanga and Barrancabermeja. Founded in 1689, San Gil is over 300 years old. It was officially named the tourist capital of the region in 2004, thanks to its outdoor activity opportunities such as rafting, caving, kayaking and hiking.

View of the main square of San Gil, Santander, 1999.

== History ==
San Gil's history goes back to pre-Columbian times, when it was inhabited by native indigenous people called the Guanes. Spanish conquest during the colonial period nearly eradicated the local tribes. The town was officially founded on March 17, 1689, by Don Gil Cabrera Dávalos and Leonardo Correa de Betancourt. According to official sources, San Gil played an important role during the Colombian independence period. "Comuneros" rebels came from nearby regions, united, traveled to the capital, Bogota, and fought for the nation's independence, a process which occurred during the early 1820s.

== Demographics ==
San Gil's population, as of 2005, was 44,959, (including the rural area). The majority (36,748) reside in the urban area. The population as of 2020 was estimated to be 59,670, an increase of roughly 14,500 people, but showing a tendency to decrease in rural areas, decreasing from 6,240 to a projected 5,601. Ninety-eight percent of houses have access to electricity, 90.3% to running water, and 84.1% to a sewage system.

== Tourism ==
In 2004, San Gil was named the tourist capital of the region. The area offers several outdoor activity opportunities, such as rafting (grade 1–5), kayaking, hiking, and caving. Local companies offer rafting packages through various rivers depending on skill level. Parque el Gallineral is a popular destination with its characteristic moss-covered trees resembling beards. The park has a number of paths running through its 10-acre area and by the city's main river, Rio Fonce. The park's name comes from the 1867 characteristic gallinero trees planted throughout the whole area. San Gil's main square is called Parque la Libertad (Liberty Park), which is the most common meeting place in the town and a hub for night life. The town's main cathedral, built in 1791 and remodeled in 1965, is located in this area. Parque Nacional del Chicamocha (Chicamocha National Park or PANACHI) is another Eco-tourist park located roughly 1 hour away from San Gil, placed on a scenic spot in the Chicamocha Canyon. The park has a museum, hiking trails, rafting, paragliding and other outdoor activities. It also has a 6.3 km (3.91 mi) long cable car, one of the longest in the world in its category, offering a ride across the canyon and into the plateau called Mesa de los Santos. Barichara, a small colonial town roughly 20 minutes away from San Gil, is another popular destination. Situated at the rim of the Chicamocha Canyon, it offers a scenic view across the canyon and the Suarez River. It is known for its well preserved colonial architecture and stone streets.

== Economy ==
Besides tourism, the region's economy relies heavily on agriculture. Products such as tobacco, sugar cane and coffee are commonly grown in farms nearby which are mainly commercialized in the town's main market plaza. One of the region's most historically important entrepreneurs was José María Rueda Gómez, known as "Conde de Cuchicute", who, in spite of his eccentricity, pushed the development of coffee production, and helped establish the first bank and a hydroelectric power plant for the region.

== Transport ==
San Gil is very well connected to the rest of the country. By air, it is connected through "Los Pozos" a small regional airport for chartered flights and seasonal commercial flights

By land Berlinas del Fonce, Copetran, Omega, Reina and Cootrasangil among other companies ensure connectivity with Bogota and Bucaramanga.

== Notable people ==
- Margalida Castro (born 1943 in San Gil) a Colombian theatre and television actress
- Jorge Luis Pinto (born 1952 in San Gil) a Colombian football coach, and former manager of the Costa Rica national football team and Honduras national football team.
- Paola Rey (born 1979, in San Gil, Santander, Colombia) is a Colombian actress and model

== Climate ==
Climate data for San Gil/Pinchote (Cucharo El), elevation 975 m (3,199 ft), (1981–2010)
| Month | Jan | Feb | Mar | Apr | May | Jun | Jul | Aug | Sep | Oct | Nov | Dec | Year |
|---|---|---|---|---|---|---|---|---|---|---|---|---|---|
| Mean daily maximum °C (°F) | 32.6 (90.7) | 33.0 (91.4) | 32.7 (90.9) | 31.5 (88.7) | 30.5 (86.9) | 30.4 (86.7) | 31.0 (87.8) | 31.3 (88.3) | 30.9 (87.6) | 30.1 (86.2) | 30.1 (86.2) | 31.3 (88.3) | 31.3 (88.3) |
| Daily mean °C (°F) | 25.5 (77.9) | 25.9 (78.6) | 25.8 (78.4) | 25.1 (77.2) | 24.5 (76.1) | 24.3 (75.7) | 24.3 (75.7) | 24.5 (76.1) | 24.3 (75.7) | 24.0 (75.2) | 24.0 (75.2) | 24.5 (76.1) | 24.7 (76.5) |
| Mean daily minimum °C (°F) | 18.5 (65.3) | 19.2 (66.6) | 19.5 (67.1) | 19.5 (67.1) | 19.4 (66.9) | 18.9 (66.0) | 18.4 (65.1) | 18.5 (65.3) | 18.5 (65.3) | 18.8 (65.8) | 18.9 (66.0) | 18.5 (65.3) | 18.9 (66.0) |
| Average precipitation mm (inches) | 28.7 (1.13) | 58.6 (2.31) | 81.3 (3.20) | 157.4 (6.20) | 162.1 (6.38) | 112.2 (4.42) | 109.6 (4.31) | 120.9 (4.76) | 147.2 (5.80) | 187.1 (7.37) | 112.7 (4.44) | 44.8 (1.76) | 1,313.5 (51.71) |
| Average precipitation days | 6 | 8 | 12 | 18 | 22 | 20 | 22 | 22 | 20 | 22 | 15 | 8 | 193 |
| Average relative humidity (%) | 66 | 65 | 66 | 72 | 78 | 78 | 76 | 75 | 76 | 78 | 78 | 72 | 74 |
| Mean monthly sunshine hours | 226.3 | 189.1 | 189.1 | 171.0 | 179.8 | 183.0 | 207.7 | 204.6 | 180.0 | 173.6 | 189.0 | 213.9 | 2,307.1 |
| Mean daily sunshine hours | 7.3 | 6.7 | 6.1 | 5.7 | 5.8 | 6.1 | 6.7 | 6.6 | 6.0 | 5.6 | 6.3 | 6.9 | 6.3 |
Source: Instituto de Hidrologia Meteorologia y Estudios Ambientales
