= Cepitá =

Municipality in Santander, Colombia

Coordinates: 6°45′N 72°59′W

- Municipality and town
- Flag

- Location of the municipality and town of Cepitá in the Santander Department of Colombia
- Country: Colombia
- Department: Santander Department
- Province: García Rovira Province

Area
  - Municipality and town: 139 km^{2} (54 sq mi)
- Elevation: 660 m (2,170 ft)

Population (2015)
  - Municipality and town: 1,865
  - Urban: 526
- Time zone: UTC-5 (Colombia Standard Time)
- Website: Official website

Cepitá is a town and municipality in the García Rovira Province, part of Santander Department in northeastern Colombia.
