= María Antonia Santos Plata =

Neogranadine peasant, rebel leader and heroine

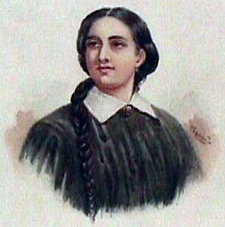
- Born: 10 April 1782; Pinchote, Viceroyalty of New Granada
- Died: 28 June 1819 (aged 37); Socorro, Viceroyalty of New Granada
- Cause of death: Execution by firing squad
- Known for: Colombian Independence leader and martyr
- Parents: Pedro Santos Meneses; María Petronila Plata Rodríguez

María Antonia Santos Plata (10 April 1782–28 June 1819) was a Neogranadine peasant, rebel leader, and heroine.

Santos Plata was born in 1782 in the town of Pinchote, in what is now modern-day Colombia. In the late 1810s, she helped galvanize, organize, finance, and lead pro-Bolívar rebel guerrillas from the Province of El Socorro against invading royalist Spanish troops during the Reconquista of the New Granada. Her brother, Fernando Santos Plata, was the commander of the rebels. At her hacienda, rebels and formed two companies of fighters. These rebels pushed back against Spanish invasion and siege, and fought in important battles such as Pantano de Vargas and the monumental Battle of Boyacá. Additionally, Santos Plata and her compatriots allegedly carried out espionage, and smaller-scale guerilla actions.

In 1819, she was captured and arrested at her home, the hacienda El Hatillo, alongside her younger brother and her niece. She was subjected to a show trial, and found guilty of lese-majesty and high treason. She was sentenced to death, and executed by firing squad in Socorro's plaza. Ten days after her death, the rebels declared victory and independence.

She is regarded to be the foremost example of the women participating in this conflict. A brigade in the Colombian army was named after her.
