= San Miguel, Santander =

San Miguel
- Municipality and town
- Flag

- Location of the municipality and town of San Miguel in the Santander Department of Colombia
- Coordinates: 6°34′34″N 72°38′45″W
- Country: Colombia
- Department: Santander Department
- Time zone: UTC-5 (Colombia Standard Time)

San Miguel (Spanish pronunciation: [ˈsam miˈɣel]) is a town and municipality in the Santander Department in northeastern Colombia.

== History ==
The town was founded January 28, 1763 by Nicolás, Miguel and Margarita Suárez, who were brothers.

== Historical review ==
Territory bordering between laches, chitareros and musics, later, of the foundation of Pamplona, valley of the balagula, seat of stays, cañaduzales and traps that made it deserve the name of the valley of honey. Later, in 1657, the visitor Diego de Baños y Sotomayor determined to annex the Valle de la Miel and the Balagula to the doctrine of Carcasí, naturally those who were least attracted to that perspective were the inhabitants of the Valle de la Miel, for which they were headed and those represented by Don Miguel Palencia, a non-influential landowner of the place and did not arrive at the archbishopric of Santafé in an application for a license to be administered in the ecclesiastic in his own chapel of Balagula. As the prosecutor of the archdiocesan curia was of the same opinion, on April 27, 1657 the provisor of the archbishopric of Santafé Lucas Fernández de Piedrahíta, authorized the foundation of the parish that the neighbors and residents of the Valley of the Honey, the Balagula and Buena Vista, under the invocation of San Miguel, in consideration of its promoter Mr. Miguel Palencia. A short time later, in 1762, with a solid church of lime and ornamental singing and with the chapel of the humiliator, the residents of San Miguel were encouraged to consider the coexistence of choosing their own parish. Finally, on August 11, Messi de la Cerda approved the new foundation in its capacity as Vicepatronato. And from 1870 by decree of President Salgar the municipalities in 1857 were renamed parishes, the administrative and territorial reorganization emanating from the constitution of 1886, restored to San Miguel the rank of municipal district from September 1877.

== Geography ==
Physical Description: San Miguel has temperate and cold thermal floors, and an average annual rainfall of 1200 millimeters. The municipal head of this municipality is located at 6º 35 'north latitude and at 72º 39' longitude west of the Greenwich meridian.

Boundaries of the municipality: San Miguel is located in the extreme southeast of the province of García Rovira, east of the department of Santander. It limits to the North with the municipalities of Enciso and Carcasa, to the East with the Municipality of Carcasa, to the South with the municipalities of Macaravita and part of Capitanejo and to the West with the municipality of Capitanejo.

- Total extension: 71 Km2
- Urban extension: 0.09 Km2
- Rural rural extension: 70.91 Km2
- Altitude of the municipal seat (meters above sea level): 2200
- Average temperature: 18 °C

=== Reference distance ===
- 209 km to Bucaramanga capital of the department
- 158 km to Duitama
- 36 km to Malaga (Via Quebrada de Vera - Agua Sucia- San Miguel)
- 22 km to Capitanejo (Via platanal - La Mesa)

== Economy ==
The economic base of San Miguel has been developed around agriculture, extensive livestock, where it was found that the agricultural sector is the largest generator of income, employment and food.

Agricultural activity: The economic activities of the municipality of San Miguel correspond primarily to the agrarian sector as a generator of income, employment and food that allow some in any way the maintenance of food security of the population.

Livestock activity The livestock activity in the municipality plays a preponderant role from the economic, social and cultural point of view. In economics, livestock is the main income for many families. In the social, livestock is present in the vast majority of medium and small farms, provides high quality proteins for the population. Culturally, the population's eating habits generally include meat, milk and its derivatives. Livestock farms for the municipality are represented by double purpose cattle and fattening cattle, goats, pigs, working horses, stall birds and meat birds and fish ponds have recently been promoted.
