= Molagavita =

Coordinates: 6°41′N 72°49′W

- fortMunicipality and town
- Flag
- Nickname: Mola
- Motto: inspirational
- Location of the municipality and town of Molagavita in the Santander Department of Colombia.
- Country: Colombia
- Department: Santander Department
- Elevation: 2.18 m (7.2 ft)
- Time zone: UTC-5 (Colombia Standard Time)
- Website: molagavita-santander.gov.co

Molagavita (Spanish pronunciation: [moloɣaˈβita]) is a town and municipality in the Santander Department in northeastern Colombia.
