= San José de Miranda =

Coordinates: 6°39′32″N 72°43′59″W

- Municipality and town
- Flag Coat of arms

- Location of the municipality and town of San José Miranda in the Santander Department of Colombia.
- Country: Colombia
- Department: Santander Department
- Elevation: 2,381 m (7,812 ft)
- Time zone: UTC-5 (Colombia Standard Time)

San José de Miranda is a town and municipality in the Santander Department in northeastern Colombia.
