= Laches, Bogotá =

Laches
- Barrio
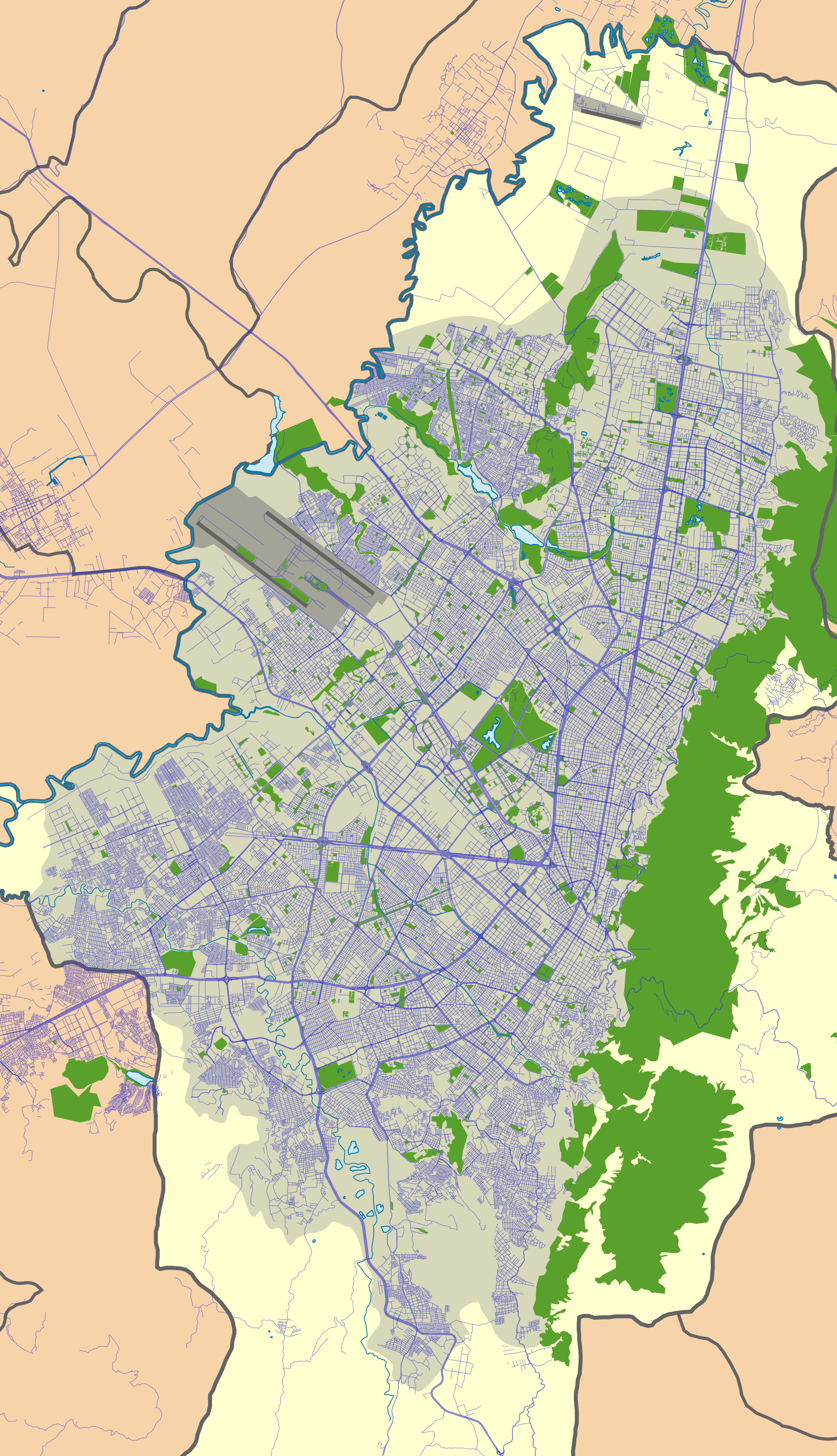
- Location in Colombia
- Coordinates: 04°35′06″N 074°03′56″W
- Country: Colombia
- Department: Distrito Capital
- City: Bogotá
- Established: 8 December 1961

Area
  - Total: .22 km^{2} (0.085 sq mi)
- Time zone: Colombia Standard Time

Laches is a neighbourhood (barrio) of Bogotá, Colombia. It is in the Santa Fe district in east-central Bogotá, on the edge of the forest reserve. Historically, the population was very poor, and continued to be so well into the twenty-first century. In fact, some 4,500 inhabitants, mostly from the poorer strata of society, live in the forest reserve area in illegal dwellings.

== Borders ==
Laches lies on the edge of the eastern hills of Bogotá and is bounded on the north by La Peña neighbourhood, on the east by forest reserve, on the south by El Rocio neighbourhood, on the west by Lourdes neighbourhood and on the northwest by El Guavio neighbourhood.

== History ==
The area of Laches was part of a 1601 grant from Don Francisco de Sande, president and governor of New Granada, to Juan and Lope de Céspedes. The de Céspedes opened a number of coal mines there in the hills east of Bogotá.

Members of the Lache people settled in this area as Bogotá grew. One of the earliest churches, "Nuestra Señora de la Peña" (Our Lady of the Rock) was built in Laches in 1722. The church contains a stone carving weighing 400 kilograms said to depict the "Holy Family" (Jesus, Mary, Joseph and the Archangel Michael), which carving was found in 1685 near Cerro Guadalupe.

In 1961, the government officially recognized Laches.
