= Socorro, Santander =

Coordinates: 6°32′N 73°12′W

El Socorro, Santander
- Municipality and town
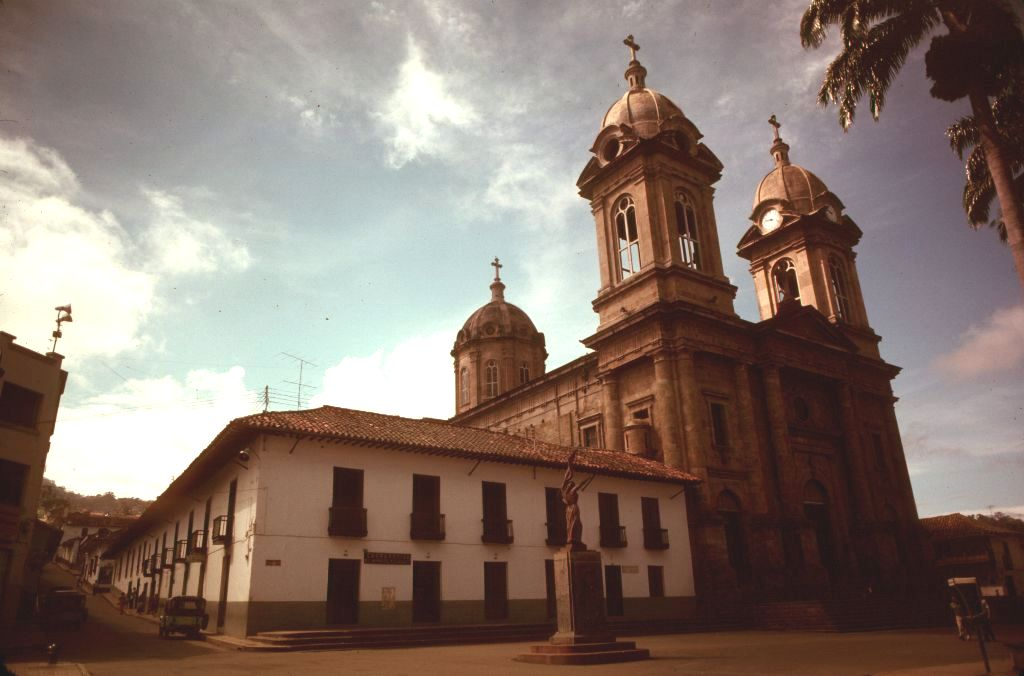
- The Socorro Cathedral, one of the Town's most known landmarks.

- Flag Coat of arms

- Location of the municipality and town of Socorro, Santander in the Santander Department of Colombia.
- Country: Colombia
- Department: Santander Department
- Foundation: March 16, 1681
- Founder: José de Archila and José Díaz Sarmiento

Government
  - Mayor: Alfonso Lineros Rodríguez

Area
  - Municipality and town: 127.8 km^{2} (49.3 sq mi)
  - Urban: 4.12 km^{2} (1.59 sq mi)
  - Rural: 123.68 km^{2} (47.75 sq mi)
- Elevation: 1,300 m (4,300 ft)

Population (2018 census)
  - Municipality and town: 32,158
  - Density: 251.6/km^{2} (651.7/sq mi)
  - Urban: 26,232
  - Urban density: 6,370/km^{2} (16,500/sq mi)
- Time zone: UTC-5 (Colombia Standard Time)
- Website: http://www.socorro-santander.gov.co

Socorro is a town and municipality in the Santander Department in northeastern Colombia. It was founded in 1681 by José de Archila and José Díaz Sarmiento. The town was very influential in the history of Colombia. There began the revolt of the Comuneros of 1781 against the oppression of Spanish rule.

Socorro was the capital of Santander between 1862 and 1886.

== History ==
The origin of the population was much more prosaic and simple. Broadly it can be argued that formed beside the road leading from Velez to Giron, the exact site where today is located. Jose de Archila and José Díaz Sarmiento, wealthy landowners chanchona Valley, donated the land to the Virgen de Nuestra Senora del Socorro, to set the village on 16 June 1683. Blas García Cabrera, influential and neighboring potentate representing many settlers, requested the erection of the parish to the metropolitan curia Santa Fe, with such good fortune, that the Archbishop Antonio Sanz Lozano Auto created it by November 27 Next, under the name of "Nuestra Senora del Socorro" and 2 December, the president, governor and captain general of New Granada, Francisco del Castillo de la Concha civilly approved the new administrative section.

At the request of Captain Francisco Arias of Toledo and numerous neighbors, after four decades of constant progress of population, chairman Archbishop Francisco de Cossio and Otero granted the title of city in 1771, which changed the name to "City of Our Lady Cossio Socorro and Otero, whose officials took office on Aug. 15. However, as such grace, not filled the legal requirements, ie they were granted by the King of Spain, Felipe V objected and overruled on December 30, 1712.

Perhaps the origin of "Very Noble and Loyal Villa", to which King III of Spain with this honorable designation lifted on 25 October 1771, granting further coat of arms on 25 April 1773, which is Marine exaltation. For the Mother of God, under the title Our Lady of Mercy, has presided over all the events of the years of Vila today.

In 1795 King Charles IV created the capital province of Socorro with the same name, in territory more than half of the current department of Santander, which remained in force until 13 May 1857, when Congress established the State of Santander, which later became king. Socorro sporadically served as capital and property since 14 September 1861 by the Constituent Assembly Act until 24 March 1886, when Dr. Antonio Roldan pro executive decree, the moved to Bucaramanga.

Socorro in the Revolution broke the Communards on 16 March 1781. Arciniegas states: "In New Granada the independence war, began to germinate in Distress" and is absolutely right. For the excessive taxes, socorran people revolted against colonial authorities in the revolution of the commoners, the only social upheaval in the annals named captains, generals as his chiefs, that is, chose a plural executive, which means that democracy was born here, the right of citizens to elect and be elected. Here also originated the army, clad in sisal-soled sandals, trousers, blanket, linen shirt and hat of bamboo, because Don Juan Generalissimo Francisco Barbee official appointed upper and lower, sergeants, corporals and the full range of levels that existed and exist in the military. The villagers were betrayed, Galan, Molina and Juan Manuel José Ortiz Manosalvas and Alcantuz paid with his life the perennial desire to be free men. But the seed of freedom remained dormant. Again the Socorrans, headed by Dr. Jose Lorenzo Silver and Martinez gave the dish with the colonial regime on 10 July 1810.

Socorro is the birthplace of Colombian painter Oscar Rodríguez Naranjo (1907–2006).

The municipality was named a Pueblo Patrimonio (heritage town) by the Colombian government in 2014, becoming the 17th town in the country (and the 3rd town in Santander) to earn that distinction.

== Geography ==
=== The location of Socorro ===
Socorro has a total land area of 12,210 hectares. It is located at the southwest of Santander Department with 6 ° 28'40 "north latitude and 72 ° 16'17" west longitude, its coordinates are X = 1.200 000 Y = 1,214,000 to 1,084,000 to 1,100,000. By car, Socorro is located 6 hours from the capital of the Republic and 121 km (2.30 h) from the Capital Department.

Farm building in Socorro in the outer rural part of the town.

Its boundaries are north to the town of Cabrera and Pinchote the south by the Socorro Confines and Palms on the east with Paramo on the west with Simacota and Palmar.

=== Landscape ===
Socorro's landscape ranges from strongly inclined (25% to 50%) to very steep (slopes greater than 75%). Having areas of gentle slope determines the usage of land to nature conservation, forestry or exploiting permanent crops such as coffee, sugar cane, citrus, banana, cassava, tomato, beans, millet, corn, watermelon, pumpkins, etc..

However, owing to the needs of the population, these regions have been affected by logging and burning of native forests for the establishment of farming in unsuitable areas, or for operation in annual crops with the consequent danger of promoting to keep soil erosion, unprotected natural vegetation, so its few reforestation programs do not consider the native vegetation to preserve the species by altering the native flora.

The steep slopes prevent the use of heavy farm machinery, by tillage implements and utensils rudimentary and smaller tools.

=== Climate and vegetation ===
The vast majority of the area which sits the Socorro corresponds to the weather that occurs in pre-montane humid forest (1,200 to 2,000 m) and tropical dry forest (900 to 1,200 masl).

One of the main factors determining the climate of the municipality is its elevation, being located in a mountainous slope. His lands are distributed in warm and temperate climatic zones, being most of the land in production between 1,000 and 1,800 m above sea level.

The temperature reaches 28 °C and minimum 17 °C, with an average of 24 °C, rainfall is enhanced during the months of April and October, while the season between the months of January and March is the most dry.

=== Municipal Boundaries ===
Its boundaries are north to the town of Cabrera and Pinchote; the south and PALMAS DEL SOCORRO; with PARAMO east on the west with Simacota and Palmar.

Total area: 122.1 km^{2}

Extension urban area: 219.5 hectares Extension rural area: 11,990.5 hectares

Altitude (meters above sea level): 1,230 m

Average temperature: 24 °C

Reference distance: 364 km (6 hours by car) from Bogota, the capital of the Republic, and 121 km (2.30 h) from Bucaramanga (the Department's Capital)

== Education ==
The Town is home to two collegiate education institutions.

1.Industrial University of Santander

2.Free University of Colombia

== Notable people ==
- José A. Morales (1913–1978), songwriter

== See also ==
- Santander, Colombia
