= Guaca, Santander =

- Municipality and town
- Flag

- Location of the municipality and town of Guaca, Santander in the Santander Department of Colombia.

- Location in Colombia
- Coordinates: 6°53′N 72°52′W
- Country: Colombia
- Department: Santander Department
- Founded: 1553

Area
  - Total: 382 km^{2} (147 sq mi)
- Elevation: 2,401 m (7,877 ft)

Population (2005)
  - Total: 6,916
  - Density: 18.1/km^{2} (46.9/sq mi)
- Time zone: UTC-5 (Colombia Standard Time)
- Website: guaca-santander.gov.co

Guaca is a town and municipality in the Santander Department in northeastern Colombia.
