= Dario Ortiz (artist) =

Colombian artist (born 1968)

- Born: September 12, 1968 (age 58); Ibagué, Colombia
- Education: Colegio San Tarsicio
- Alma mater: Jorge Tadeo Lozano University
- Known for: Contributor to the Ibaque newspaper, El Nuevo Día
- Notable work: Oscar Rodríguez Naranjo, the painter of beauty
- Website: Web page

Dario Ortiz Robledo (born September 12, 1968) is a Colombian artist.

== Biography ==
Ortiz, a self-taught artist, was born in Ibagué, Colombia. He graduated from the Colegio San Tarsicio in Bogotá in 1986. He studied History and Art Appreciation at Jorge Tadeo Lozano University in 1990–1991. Since 1995, he has been a contributor to the Ibaque newspaper, El Nuevo Día.

His publications include the books Oscar Rodríguez Naranjo, the painter of beauty (1996), Neorealism (2000), in collaboration with Carol Damian, and the essays Vásquez de Arce y Ceballos drawings (2007), A Brief History of the arts in the territory of Tolima (2007), and A novel painted (2008).

In 2003, Ortiz founded, and is the head of, the Museo de Arte del Tolima in Ibagué.

== Public collections ==
- Museum of Latin American Art, Long Beach, California
- Museo Civico di Abano Terme, Padua, Italy
- Museo de Arte Contemporáneo, Guayaquil, Ecuador
- Museo Maguncia, Buenos Aires, Argentina
- Museo de Arte Moderno, Cuenca, Ecuador
- Museo de Arte del Tolima, Ibagué, Colombia
- Museo de Antioquia, Medellín, Colombia
- Museo Bolivariano de Arte Contemporáneo, Santa Marta, Colombia

== Recent solo exhibitions ==
2003:

- Darío Ortiz, drawings: Alfred Wild Gallery, Bogotá
- The time an entelechy: Cultural Center El Arcangel, Vienna, Austria
- The time an entelechy: Presidential Palace, Bratislava, Slovakia

2006:

- The human Condition: Mundo Gallery, Bogotá
- Darío Ortiz 2005-2006: ArtBo 2006, Bogotá

2007:

- Darío Ortiz, FIA 07: Latin American Art Fair, Caracas, Venezuela

2008:

- Window to the world: Museum of Art of Tolima, Ibagué
- Window to the world: Museo of Contemporary Art of Huila, Neiva
- Window to the world: Bolivarian Museum of Contemporary Art, Santa Marta
- Window to the world: Convent of Santo Domingo, Cartagena

2009:

- Window to the world: Museum of Modern Art, Cuenca, Ecuador
- Darío Ortiz, Intimate mythology: Metropolitan Museum Center, Quito
- Darío Ortiz, Intimate mythology: Museum of Contemporary Art, Guayaquil, Ecuador

2010:

- Los versos apócrifos de Dante: Museo Maguncia, Buenos Aires
- Etchings:Museo Rayo, Roldanillo
- Guan Xiang Art Gallery Zhengzhou city, China
- Banditrazos Art Gallery, Seoul, Korea
