= Pinchote =

Coordinates: 6°32′N 73°11′W

- Municipality and town
- Flag

- Location of the municipality and town of Pinchote in the Santander Department of Colombia.
- Country: Colombia
- Department: Santander Department
- Time zone: UTC-5 (Colombia Standard Time)

Pinchote is a town and municipality in the Santander Department in northeastern Colombia.

== Climate ==
Climate data for Pinchote (Cucharo El), elevation 975 m (3,199 ft), (1981–2010)
Month	Jan	Feb	Mar	Apr	May	Jun	Jul	Aug	Sep	Oct	Nov	Dec	Year
Mean daily maximum °C (°F)	32.6 (90.7)	33.0 (91.4)	32.7 (90.9)	31.5 (88.7)	30.5 (86.9)	30.4 (86.7)	31.0 (87.8)	31.3 (88.3)	30.9 (87.6)	30.1 (86.2)	30.1 (86.2)	31.3 (88.3)	31.3 (88.3)
Daily mean °C (°F)	25.5 (77.9)	25.9 (78.6)	25.8 (78.4)	25.1 (77.2)	24.5 (76.1)	24.3 (75.7)	24.3 (75.7)	24.5 (76.1)	24.3 (75.7)	24.0 (75.2)	24.0 (75.2)	24.5 (76.1)	24.7 (76.5)
Mean daily minimum °C (°F)	18.5 (65.3)	19.2 (66.6)	19.5 (67.1)	19.5 (67.1)	19.4 (66.9)	18.9 (66.0)	18.4 (65.1)	18.5 (65.3)	18.5 (65.3)	18.8 (65.8)	18.9 (66.0)	18.5 (65.3)	18.9 (66.0)
Average precipitation mm (inches)	28.7 (1.13)	58.6 (2.31)	81.3 (3.20)	157.4 (6.20)	162.1 (6.38)	112.2 (4.42)	109.6 (4.31)	120.9 (4.76)	147.2 (5.80)	187.1 (7.37)	112.7 (4.44)	44.8 (1.76)	1,313.5 (51.71)
Average precipitation days	6	8	12	18	22	20	22	22	20	22	15	8	193
Average relative humidity (%)	66	65	66	72	78	78	76	75	76	78	78	72	74
Mean monthly sunshine hours	226.3	189.1	189.1	171.0	179.8	183.0	207.7	204.6	180.0	173.6	189.0	213.9	2,307.1
Mean daily sunshine hours	7.3	6.7	6.1	5.7	5.8	6.1	6.7	6.6	6.0	5.6	6.3	6.9	6.3
Source: Instituto de Hidrologia Meteorologia y Estudios Ambientales
