= Cerrito, Santander =

Coordinates: 6.845°N 72.698°W

- Municipality and town
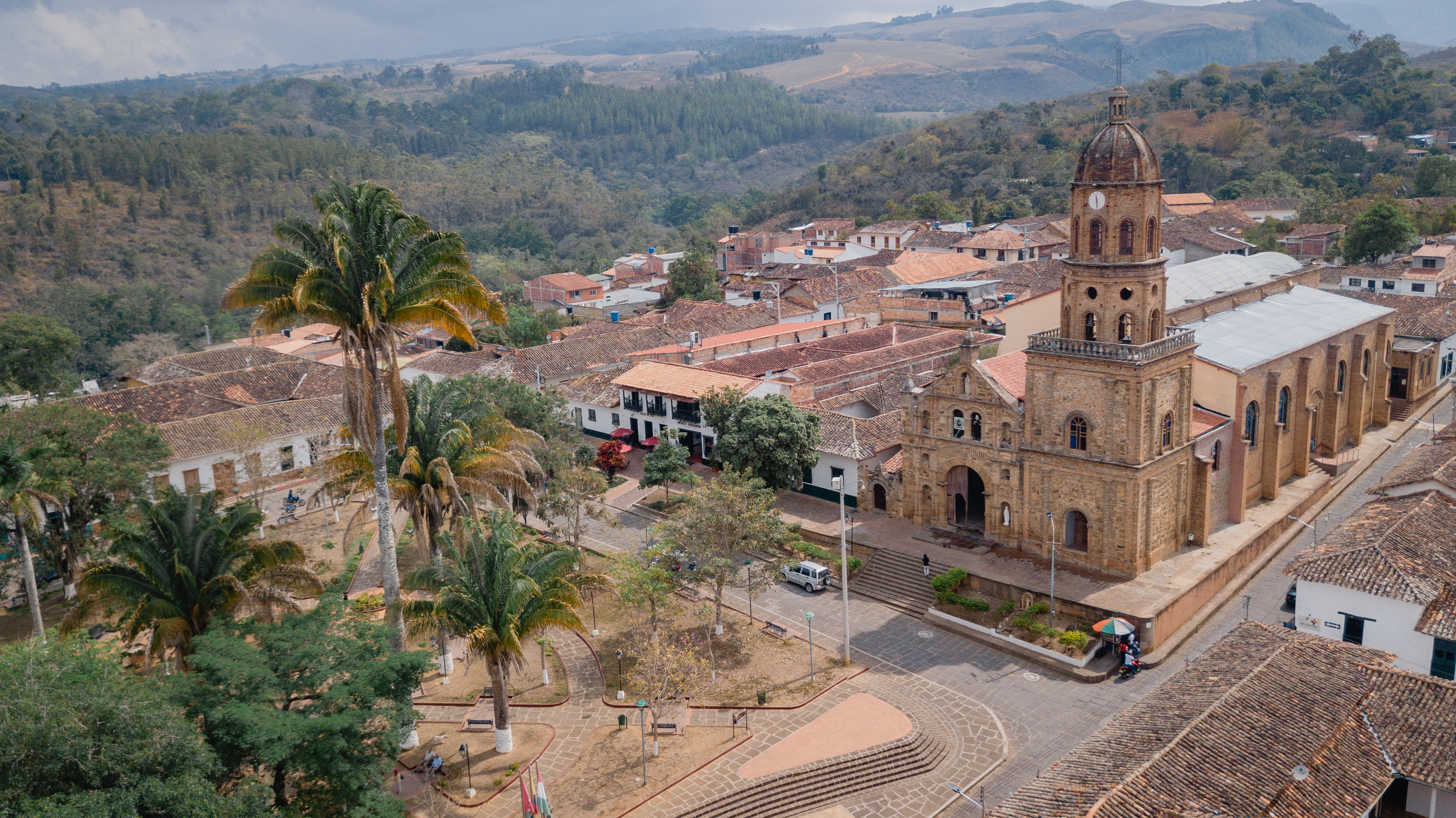

- Flag Coat of arms

- Location of the municipality and town of Cerrito, Santander in the Santander Department of Colombia.
- Country: Colombia
- Department: Santander Department
- Time zone: UTC-5 (Colombia Standard Time)

Cerrito is a Colombian municipality in the Santander Department located in the province of García Rovira in northeastern Colombia. It is noted for its natural environment and for having emblematic places of the department such as the chapel of Jesus Nazareno and the ruins of a Spanish seminary in the village of Servitá.

== History ==
In 1772, the population of Servitá was linked to the parish of Concepción. The inhabitants of the site "Aposentos del Cerrito", found it difficult to access the spiritual administration because the church of the new parish to which they had been attached was very far away, so the foundation of the municipality was approved in 1775 by the viceroy Manuel Guirior, in response to a community petition from the inhabitants of the area.

The inhabitants, led by Vicente Calderón, had sent to the archbishop of Santafé de Bogotá a petition to found their own parish, because the roads in the region were dangerous and impassable, making it difficult for people to attend religious services.

After the separation with Spain, the Cerritanos took part in several civil wars, for which the municipal council approved, on June 29, 1889, the resolution by means of which the council, the employees and all the inhabitants of the Municipality of Cerrito were consecrated to the Sacred Heart of Jesus.

== Geography ==
The town, which has an area of 549 km^{2}, is located in a cold territory (its headwaters have temperatures close to 14 - 16 °C), close to the Paramo del almorzadero". The altitude of the territory is between 2220 and 4200 meters above sea level. The highest mountain pass in Colombia is located at an approximate altitude of 3800 meters above sea level in the "Páramo del Almorzadero".

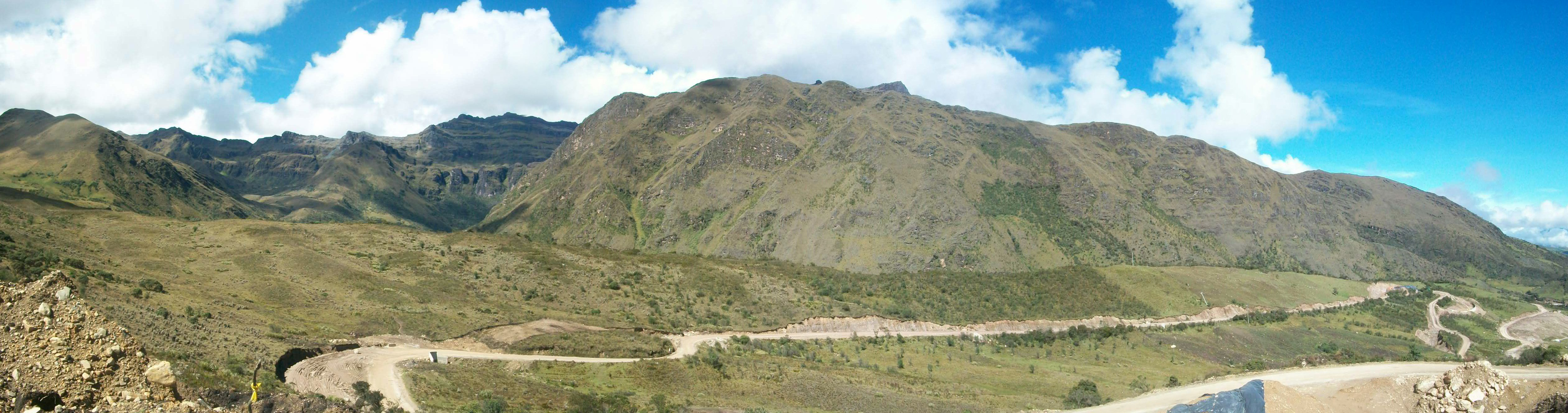
Vista del páramo en el municipio Cerrito.

== Climate ==
Climate data for Cerrito (Tinaga Gja), elevation 2,698 m (8,852 ft), (1981–2010)
Month	Jan	Feb	Mar	Apr	May	Jun	Jul	Aug	Sep	Oct	Nov	Dec	Year
Mean daily maximum °C (°F)	20.0 (68.0)	20.2 (68.4)	20.1 (68.2)	19.5 (67.1)	19.0 (66.2)	18.5 (65.3)	18.2 (64.8)	18.3 (64.9)	18.5 (65.3)	18.4 (65.1)	18.6 (65.5)	19.4 (66.9)	19.0 (66.2)
Daily mean °C (°F)	13.8 (56.8)	14.0 (57.2)	13.9 (57.0)	13.8 (56.8)	13.7 (56.7)	13.5 (56.3)	13.2 (55.8)	13.2 (55.8)	13.2 (55.8)	13.2 (55.8)	13.5 (56.3)	13.7 (56.7)	13.6 (56.5)
Mean daily minimum °C (°F)	7.6 (45.7)	8.2 (46.8)	8.3 (46.9)	9.0 (48.2)	9.0 (48.2)	9.0 (48.2)	8.5 (47.3)	8.4 (47.1)	8.2 (46.8)	8.3 (46.9)	8.3 (46.9)	7.9 (46.2)	8.4 (47.1)
Average precipitation mm (inches)	29.6 (1.17)	50.1 (1.97)	90.3 (3.56)	146.8 (5.78)	145.6 (5.73)	86.1 (3.39)	72.2 (2.84)	103.6 (4.08)	143.1 (5.63)	168.8 (6.65)	122.7 (4.83)	53.3 (2.10)	1,212.3 (47.73)
Average precipitation days	8	9	13	17	19	17	17	19	21	21	15	10	184
Average relative humidity (%)	69	70	73	78	79	77	76	77	78	80	78	72	76
Mean monthly sunshine hours	210.8	160.9	173.6	132.0	130.2	117.0	151.9	142.6	138.0	133.3	150.0	189.1	1,829.4
Mean daily sunshine hours	6.8	5.7	5.6	4.4	4.2	3.9	4.9	4.6	4.6	4.3	5.0	6.1	5.0
Source: Instituto de Hidrologia Meteorologia y Estudios Ambientales

== Poisoning of condors ==
Inhabitants of this municipality by January 2019 had poisoned with contaminated carrion up to 5 Andean Condors alleging without grounds that "they are a danger to livestock". They've been killing Condors with this justification for generations, as is one of the oldest "municipios" in the country.

The news caused repudiation by animal rights groups and citizens in general, especially because of the cruel nature of the facts and the means by which the villagers justified the actions. In Colombia, the condor is a national symbol and its deliberate hunting, capture or mistreatment is considered a heinous crime. It is estimated that the number of Andean condors inhabiting the Colombian area of the Andes Mountains does not exceed 150 specimens, which makes the events, which eventually went unpunished, controversial.

At the end of May 2021, 2 condors were found dead in the Páramo del Almorzadero sector. One more was found on June 1 nearby, severely intoxicated. Despite the efforts of veterinarians, the condor did not survive. Later, remains of a contaminated carrion were found in the sector of Mata de Lata (near the neighboring municipality of Guaca). The condor carcasses were taken to the Colombian Veterinary Forensic Medicine clinic "Animal Defense" in Medellín to be examined and the Attorney General's Office undertook to clarify the facts, which after successive attacks with poisoned carrion have left more than twenty condors dead in the area of influence of the municipality in the last decade and not a single person prosecuted.

According to the statistics of the CAS (Corporación Autónoma Regional de Santander) this municipality occupies the first place in deaths of Andean Condors by poisoning in the distribution area of the species in the Colombian Andes.
