= Enciso, Santander =

Enciso
- Municipality and town
- Flag Coat of arms

- Location of the municipality and town of Enciso in the Santander Department of Colombia
- Coordinates: 06°40′05″N 72°41′58″W
- Country: Colombia
- Department: Santander Department
- Province: García Rovira Province

Government
  - Mayor: Yamith Hernandez Blanco

Area
  - Land: 7,273 km^{2} (2,808 sq mi)
- Elevation: 1,484 m (4,869 ft)

Population (2015)
  - Municipality and town: 3,323
  - Urban: 640
- Time zone: UTC-5 (Colombia Standard Time)
- Website: enciso-santander.gov.co

Enciso is a town and municipality in the García Rovira Province, part of Santander Department in northeastern Colombia. Founded on September 9, 1773, by Juan de Enciso, the liberating campaign of Simon Bolivar passed by this municipality on 7 occasions between the years 1814 and 1821.
