= Capitanejo, Santander =

Coordinates: 6°32′N 72°42′W

Capitanejo
- Municipality and town
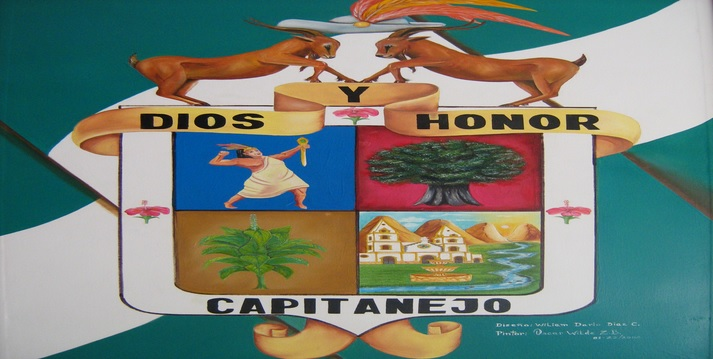
- Flag Coat of arms

- Location of the municipality and town of Capitanejo in the Santander Department of Colombia.
- Country: Colombia
- Department: Santander Department
- Time zone: UTC-5 (Colombia Standard Time)

Capitanejo is a town and municipality in the Santander Department of northeastern Colombia. It is one of the towns in the province of García Rovira on the banks of the Chicamocha River. It is located 197 km (122 mi) from the departmental capital, Bucaramanga, and 35 km (22 mi) from Málaga, the capital of the province. It is 189 km (117 mi) from the city of Tunja and 136 km (85 mi) from Duitama, on the "Troncal Central del Norte" highway Route 55.

== History ==
In the Pre-Hispanic era, the beautiful Chicamocha Valley was populated by a group of natives, whom the Spaniards called Chitareros, and extended their dominion in most of the current Province of García Rovira, reaching Pamplona and the western part of Táchira State, Venezuela.

The conquistadors who came to the territory where the town of Capitanejo is located found a group of indigenous Chitareros, led by "Don Bernabe," Cacique Chicamocha, and, in his honor, gave the name to these as Chicamocha Indians; from there also came the name of the region and the name of the river, which in the beginning was called Rio Grande.

The name Chicamocha is an indigenous name, which bears close similarity with other names of the Chibcha linguistic family, such as Chibchacún and Chiminigagua, the Muisca gods.

These clever aborigines had already set up La Cubaya, or Tarabita, which allowed them to safely cross the Rio Grande to communicate with their neighbors, the Muiscas, Laches, and Guanes.

The administration of Cabuya was exercised by the Chicamocha Indians; they defended it during the conquest and the Colony.

The system of the cabuya or tarabita still subsists in Capitanejo, because today it is still used to cross the rivers Chicamocha, Nevado, and Servitá, on the riverside paths where there are no bridges. And it is also cataloged as an extreme sport.

In 1597, a "Royal Certificate" gave the Dominican Fathers the "doctrine" of the valley of Chicamocha, where they remained for almost 200 years; the Dominicans were the first evangelizers of these regions. At the beginning of the seventeenth century, it was established in the region, thanks to the benefits of the lands that were granted by President Don Juan de Borja, three Canarian immigrants who played an important role in the First Parish Erection in Capitanejo: The Captain Don Bartolomé de Aguilar, Father Juan Bautista García, and the nephew of both, Cristóbal Verde de Aguilar.

These men were the promoters of the parish foundation, their support, and the beginning of life as a people in that area. The three men came from the Canary Islands, a Spanish colony at that time.

== Name of Capitanejo ==
The recently formed town of Chicamocha soon happened to be called The Capitanejo. This name, says Father Ismael Mejía in his unpublished notes, was given by Don Cristóbal Verde de Aguilar, who held the Captain title, and has an intimate relationship with his title. It means, then, similarity to Captain, in honor of its founding Captains.

== Geography ==
Capitanejo is located in the East of the Department, with an area of 81 km 2. It has an average altitude of 1090 masl with a dry, warm climate at a temperature of 25 C. It is located 197 km (122 mi) from the city of Bucaramanga by a difficult road that connects the towns of San José de Miranda and Málaga City. San Andrés, Guaca, and Piedecuesta city to get to the Capital. From Bucaramanga, the distance between Capitanejo and Málaga, the capital of the province, is 34.5 km, with a travel time of 50 minutes.

The distance from Capitanejo to the capital of the country, Bogotá, is 328 km via paved road. The travel time is 6 hours.

=== Climate ===
Capitanejo has a relatively dry tropical savanna climate (Köppen: Aw) with hot days and mild nights.

Climate data for Capitanejo, elevation 1,160 m (3,810 ft), (1981–2010)
Month	Jan	Feb	Mar	Apr	May	Jun	Jul	Aug	Sep	Oct	Nov	Dec	Year
Mean daily maximum °C (°F)	34.1 (93.4)	34.4 (93.9)	34.2 (93.6)	33.4 (92.1)	32.6 (90.7)	32.6 (90.7)	33.1 (91.6)	33.4 (92.1)	32.9 (91.2)	32.0 (89.6)	32.2 (90.0)	33.3 (91.9)	33.2 (91.7)
Mean daily minimum °C (°F)	17.8 (64.0)	18.1 (64.6)	18.7 (65.7)	18.9 (66.0)	18.4 (65.1)	17.8 (64.0)	17.4 (63.3)	17.6 (63.7)	17.7 (63.9)	17.9 (64.2)	18.2 (64.8)	17.9 (64.2)	18.0 (64.4)
Average precipitation mm (inches)	14.2 (0.56)	27.6 (1.09)	54.7 (2.15)	90.1 (3.55)	103.6 (4.08)	61.2 (2.41)	47.4 (1.87)	64.6 (2.54)	97.1 (3.82)	129.5 (5.10)	59.5 (2.34)	21.7 (0.85)	771.2 (30.36)
Average precipitation days	4	6	10	17	19	16	15	15	18	20	14	7	160
Average relative humidity (%)	58	58	61	64	68	67	65	64	66	68	66	61	64
Mean monthly sunshine hours	244.9	211.7	213.9	186.0	192.2	186.0	210.8	210.8	189.0	189.1	195.0	232.5	2,461.9
Mean daily sunshine hours	7.9	7.5	6.9	6.2	6.2	6.2	6.8	6.8	6.3	6.1	6.5	7.5	6.7
Source: Instituto de Hidrologia Meteorologia y Estudios Ambientales

== Ecology ==
Due to its dry warm climate, it has a vegetation that forms a great variety of crops such as: tobacco, tomato, melon and sugarcane; wild trees or shrubs include: the cují, moral, chicken, yabo, mion, yurumo, totumo, tree bread, fig, acacias, mulato, oreganillo, yatago, some fruit such as mamón, coconut, zapote, avocado, mango, orange, tangerine, papaya, guayaba, congolos, passion fruit, sweet lemon, anon, tamarind, guanabana, guama and watermelon, another vegetation that characterizes and identifies the municipality are the cactus varieties known as tunos, as well as a unique species of large spines known as guasábaras.

Of its wildlife, we can say that there are snakes such as coral snakes and rattlesnakes, among others; iguanas, lizards, faras, weasels, owls, hawks, and birds of great variety such as tiles, mirlas, toches, turpiales, coha, swallows, redheads, copetones, pispirillos, and pigeons (Torcaza). In the high parts of the town there are foxes, partridges, rabbits, squirrels, and tinajos.

In times of uplift, the Chicamocha River presents fish: Bocachico, chocuas or coroncoro, nicuro, but due to the high degree of pollution of the river, these species are in danger of extinction.

== Economy ==
The production of Capitanejo is purely agricultural; its main production is the cultivation of tobacco, which generates great economic movement in the municipality and other neighboring towns, and provides direct income to the peasant farmer who celebrates a contract of sale with the tobacco companies (Philip Morris International and the British American Tobacco), who are in charge of providing technical assistance, cash loans for the maintenance of the harvest, as well as the basic supplies and tools and the benefit of the sheet.

A local trade is developed where the sale of products and services is carried out, represented in grocery stores and groceries, restaurants whose specialty is the sweaty goat and the pepitoria, hotels that meet the demand of visitors and people passing by, snack bars, drugstores, fast foods and fritangas, hardware stores, misceláneas, stationeries, stores of clothes and footwear and like greater characterization the traditional taverns where the beer is consumed, drink very desired by the warmth of the climate, with places of relaxation like billiards, fields of bolus and the frequent galleras that characterize Capitanejo.

Indirectly, employment is generated in the transport of both the harvesters and the raw material, for the time of collection and sale increases the economic income to restaurants, service stations, warehouses, and food depots.

As for retail, the municipality is based on small grocery stores, informal clothing stores, bakeries, service stations, carpentry shops, electrical decoration workshops, shoe repair, and ice cream shops.

== Goat and Cattle Activity ==
The livestock farms in Capitanejo play a very important role from the economic, social, and cultural point of view. In economics, livestock is the main income for many families. Socially, livestock is present in the vast majority of medium and small farms and provides protein for the population. Culturally, the eating habits of the inhabitants generally include meat, milk, and its derivatives. Livestock farms in the municipality are represented by dual-purpose cattle (milk and young), integrated fattening cattle, goats, pigs, working horses, laying birds, and meat birds, mainly.

== Industrial activity ==
In the municipality, there are no industrial activities. There are some mining activities around small exploitations of rock materials from some quarries located in the jurisdiction of the municipality; in the rest of the municipality, there are small establishments dedicated to the production of food, such as bakeries, confectioneries, dairy products, and food for domestic consumption.

== Tourist activity ==
Due to its climatic characteristics, the municipality offers visitors natural spaces such as the beaches of Chicamocha, Servitá, Tunebo, and Río Nevado. Within its tourist infrastructure, the municipality has 4 hotels and 4 residences for visitors' hostels. There are also two recreational sites and several resting places where visitors can enjoy sunny days and savor the typical dish of the region (sweaty Cabro).

It is a tourist destination in the province of García Rovira. The typical dishes are the cabro, the tamale, and the mute santandereano, which are offered to its visitors.

Celebrate the festivities of San Bartolomé in the month of August. The Feast of the Virgen del Carmen is on July 16. Christmas carnival from December 24 to December 31.

The indigenous handicrafts are: ceramics, baskets in cane brava, cotizas de fique, mats in reed, and straw hats.

== The sites of interest ==
The Temple of San Bartolome Apostol, the hot springs of San Francisco, the Chicamocha Canyon, the Cascade of La Loma, the House of Culture, the Chicamocha River Beaches, the Temple of the Divine Child, Viewpoint and Chapel of the Sacred Heart, Spas, La Chorrera Waterfall, the Chicamocha River, the Hoya Grande Viewpoint, the Sanctuary of Saint Cristo del Carmen, among others. In their parties, carnivals, popular festivals, exhibitions, typical dances, and gunpowder are made.

It is a place of Santandereano folklore, like guitar music of the 70s and 80s; one of its main representative songs is "María Antonia," composed by José A. Morales. It has great artists and entrepreneurs.
