= Carcasí =

Coordinates: 6°38′N 72°38′W

Carcasi
- Municipality and town
- Flag

- Location of the municipality and town of Carcasí in the Santander Department of Colombia
- Country: Colombia
- Department: Santander Department
- Province: García Rovira Province

Government
  - Mayor: Germán Eugenio Jurado (2016-2019)
- Elevation: 2,080 m (6,820 ft)

Population (2015)
  - Municipality and town: 5,039
  - Urban: 652
- Time zone: UTC-5 (Colombia Standard Time)
- Climate: Cfb
- Website: Official website

Carcasí (Spanish pronunciation: [kaɾˈkasi]) is a town and municipality in the García Rovira Province, part of the Santander Department in northeastern Colombia.
