= San Andrés, Santander =

Coordinates: 6.81278°N 72.8536°W

- Municipality and town
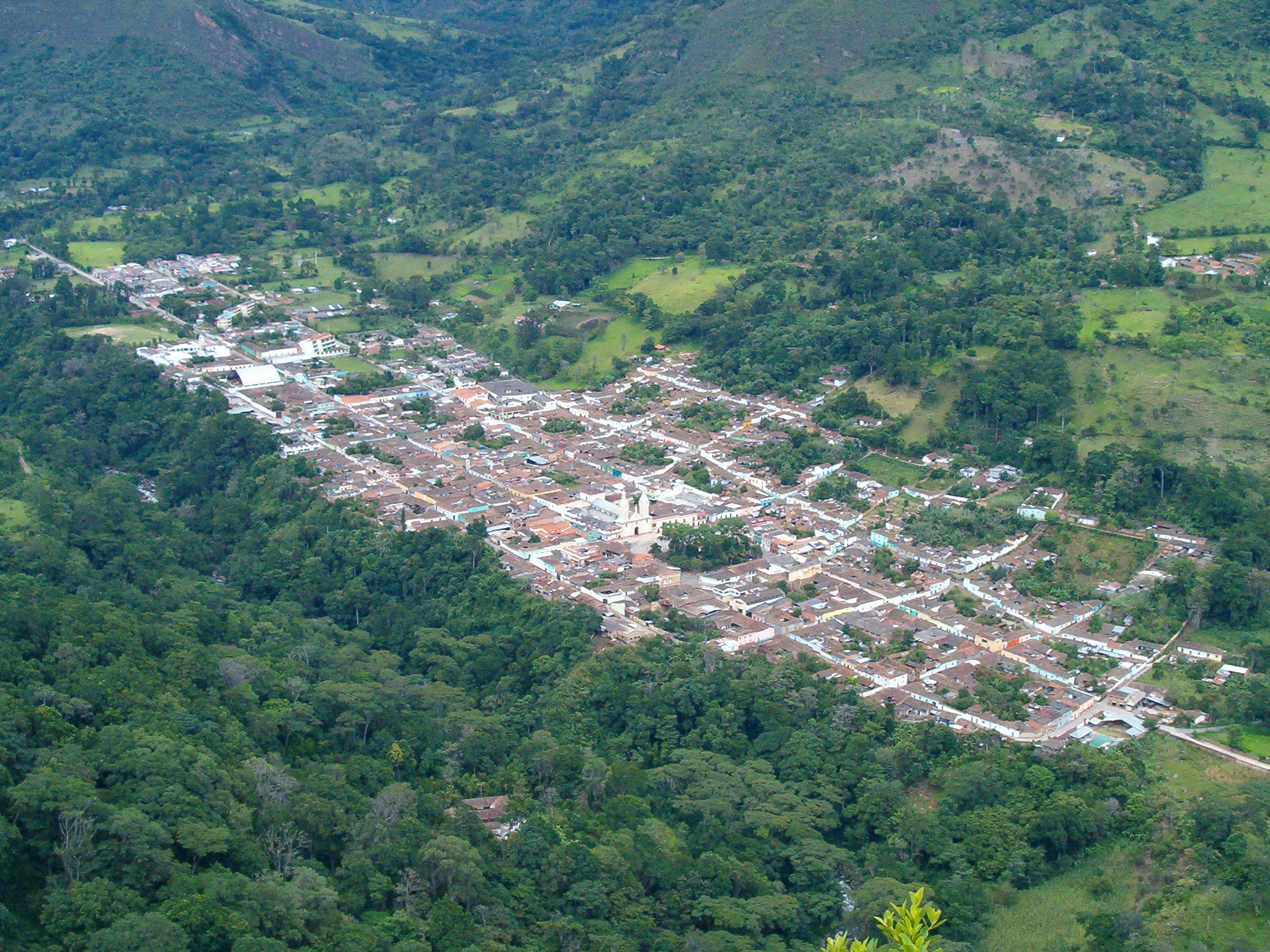

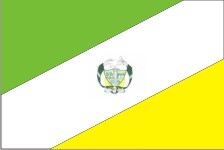
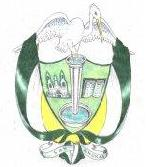
- Flag Coat of arms

- Location of the municipality and town of San Andrés, Santander in the Santander Department of Colombia.
- Country: Colombia
- Department: Santander Department
- Time zone: UTC-5 (Colombia Standard Time)

San Andrés is a town and municipality in the Santander Department in northeastern Colombia. Olympian Noe Balvin was born here.
