= Guane people =

Extinct South American people

Guane
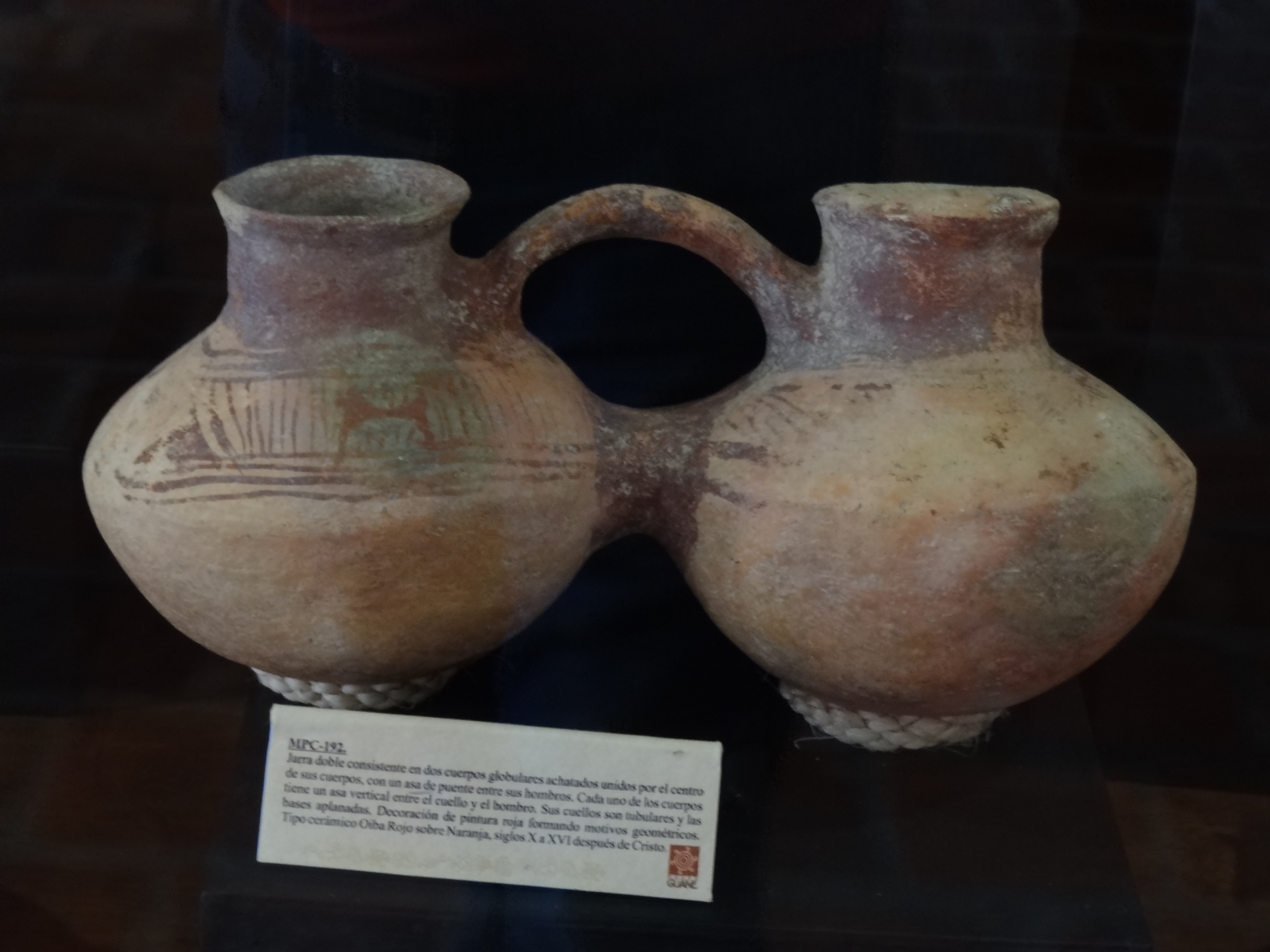
- Guane doubled-chambered, ceramic, stirrup-spout vessel, 10th–16th century CE, exhibited at Chicamocha National Park

Regions with significant populations
- Santander, Boyacá, Colombia

Languages
- Chibcha, Colombian Spanish

Religion
- Traditional religion, Roman Catholicism

Related ethnic groups
- Lache, U'wa, Muisca, Muzo, Yarigui

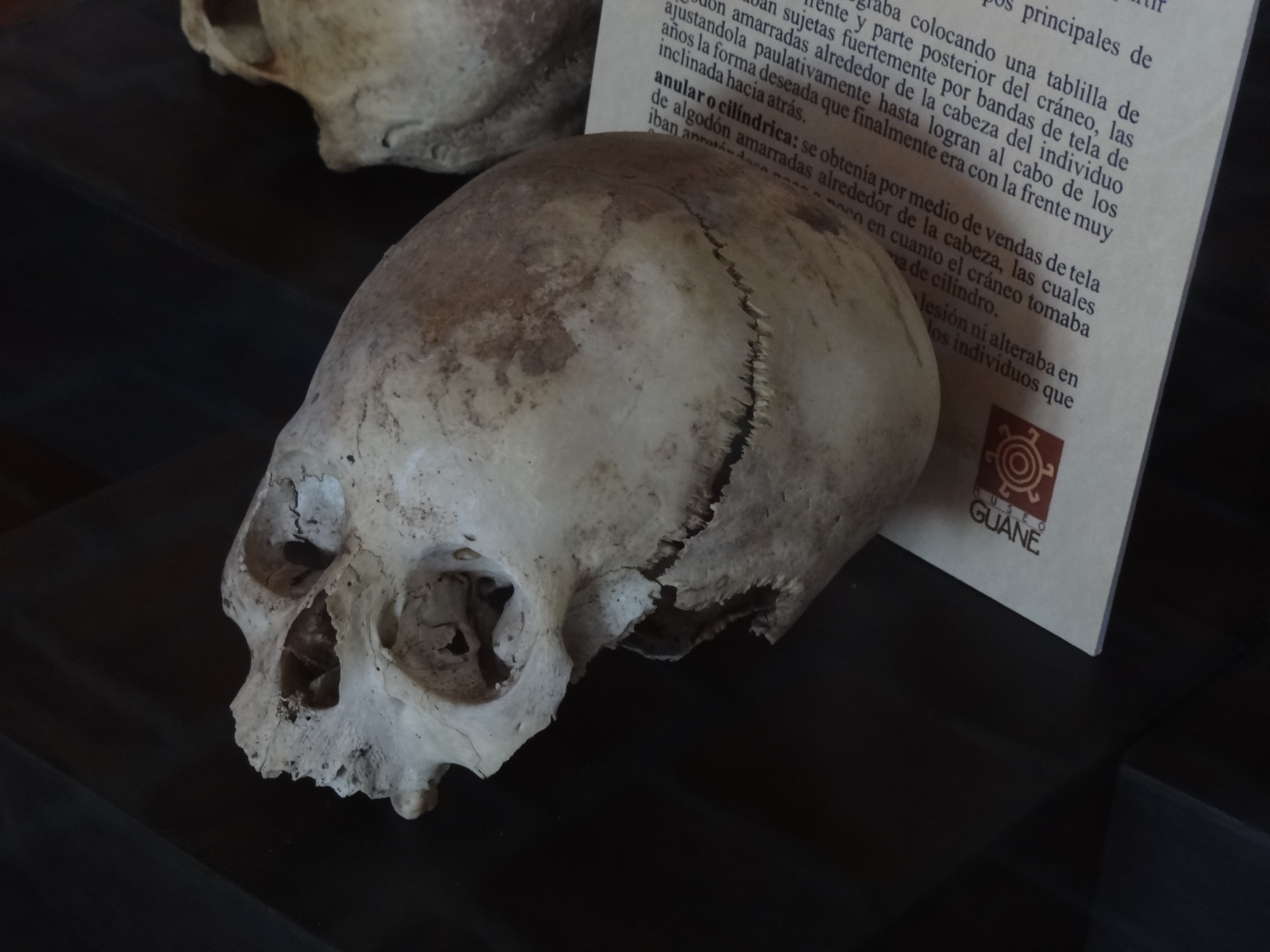
Deformed Guane skull

The Guane people of Colombia in South America live mainly in the cities of Santander, Bucaramanga and Barichara. A population estimate made by DANE(Departamento Administrativo Nacional de Estadística) in 2005, was that around 812 people in Santander identified as Guane, with 409 being men and 403 being women.

== Etymology ==
The etymology of the word Guane is not known with certainty. The most prominent reasoning states that it came from the Muisca people, the Guane’s neighbors, who referred to them as ‘Guatas’ which means ‘tall’ in the Musyccubun language. It evolved to become ‘Guates’ and then eventually Guanes. Guane people from this time period were reported to be as tall as 1.76m, taller than most other native groups at the time.

== Pre-colonial period ==
Before European-contact the Guane People lived in the area of Santander and north of Boyacá, both departments of present-day central-Colombia. They were farmers cultivating cotton, pineapple and other crops, and skilled artisans working in cotton textiles. The Guane lived north of the Chicamocha River, around the Chicamocha Canyon in an area stretching from Vélez in the south to the capital of Santander; Bucaramanga in the north. Other sources state their territory did not extend so far north. Guane, a corregimiento of Barichara, Santander, is said to have been the capital of the Guane people.

=== Culture and art ===
Guane culture during this time period had many aspects to it. They celebrated on many different occasions such as the start of puberty, the teething of a baby, and the start of the new lunar year. They had multiple leader for each village, however, all of the Guane were led by a man named Guanetá by the time the Spanish .

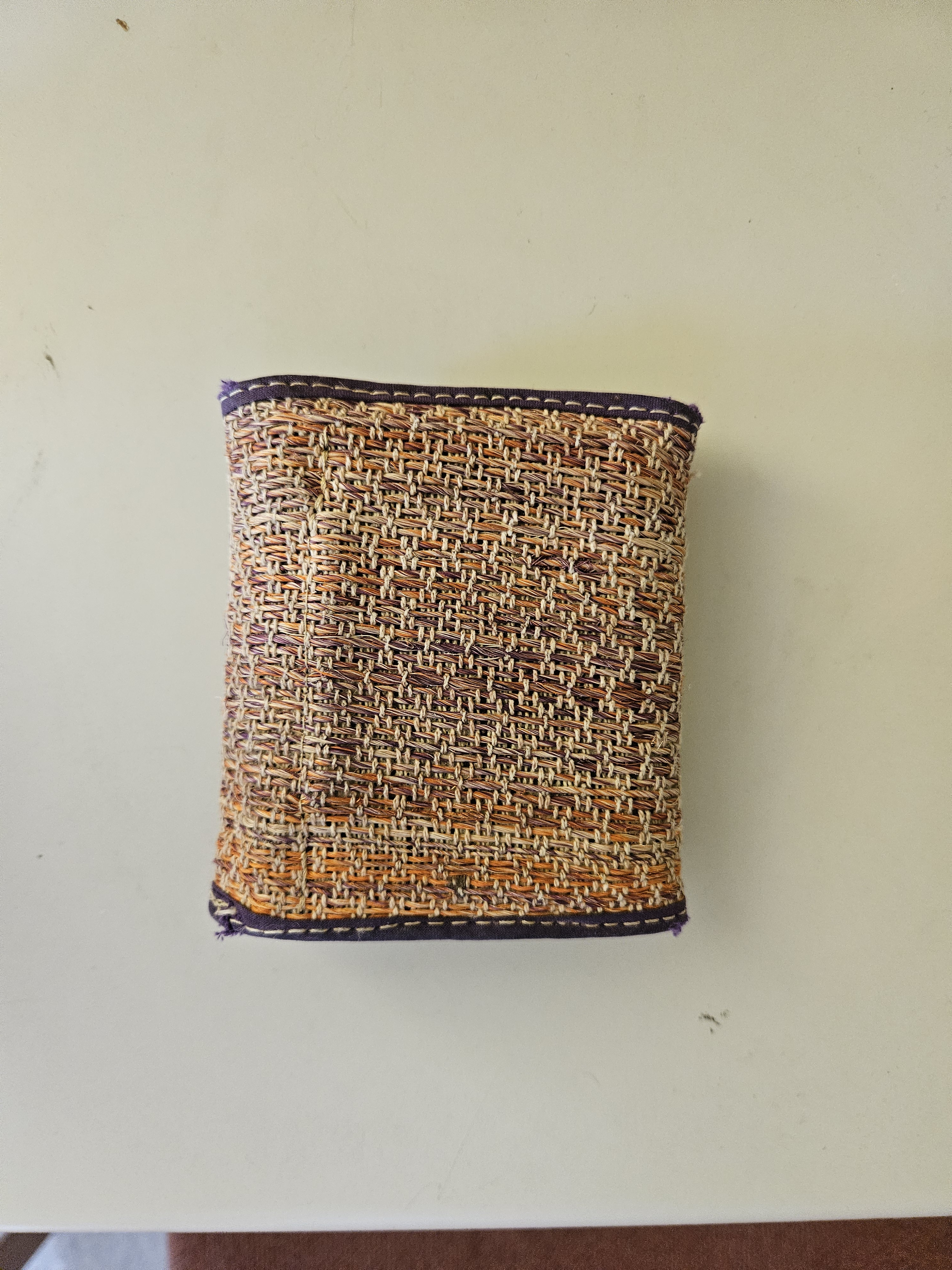
A wallet made from fique, the fibrous plant that the Guane harvest and use

The Guane made their own weapons, including arrows and spears. They interchanged plants for the stewpot with the Chitarero on the east and the Muisca to the south of their territories. The mantle making of the Guanes was well known in pre-Columbian Colombia. Mantles made from cotton have been dated back to the 11th century AD. The Guane cultivated tobacco and made products of fique.

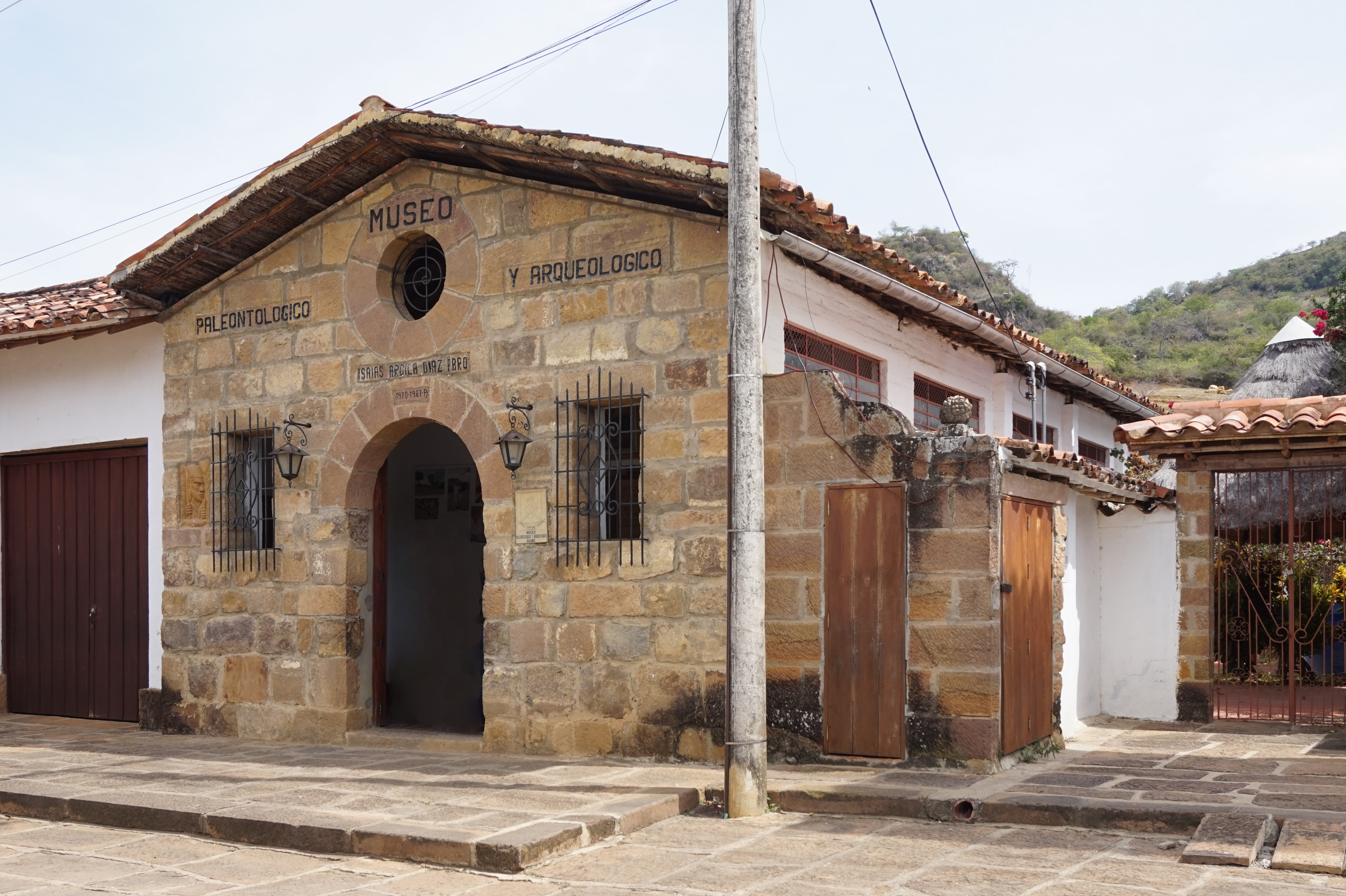
Museum about the Guane People in Guane, Santader

The Guane also had their own style of music and art. Many illustrations and iconographies are found all over Santander that depict interpretations of people, events, animals, and other forms of artistic expression.

=== Language ===
Like the Muisca, U'wa and Lache, the Guane spoke a Chibchan language.

== Colonization and the Spanish genocide ==
Like with most Indigenous groups the Guane suffered at the hands of the Spanish, nevertheless they fought back. At first, Spanish explorers entered their territory on friendly terms, however, eventually a Captain named Martín Galeano made his way into their land with an armed force at his back. The Guane, led at the time by Guanetá, fought back with all their projectile weapons in order to slow the advance of the Spanish. The Spanish eventually made it to their position and unleashed a violent attack of which few of the Guane people present were able to escape. Guanetá, in the face of being captured, chose to sacrifice himself instead of being succumbing to the violence of the Spanish.

Another rebellion was later led by another Guane leader named Chanchón. Despite the many other Guane leaders that formed diplomatic relationships with Galeano, Chanchón fought against the diplomats that were sent by the Spanish. Chanchón continued to fight numerous battles against the Spanish with the goal being to liberate the Guane territory and remove the Spanish from the region, however, despite his best efforts and collaborations with other Guane leaders, many thousands of Guane were slaughtered at the hands of the Spanish as they continued their presence in the region.

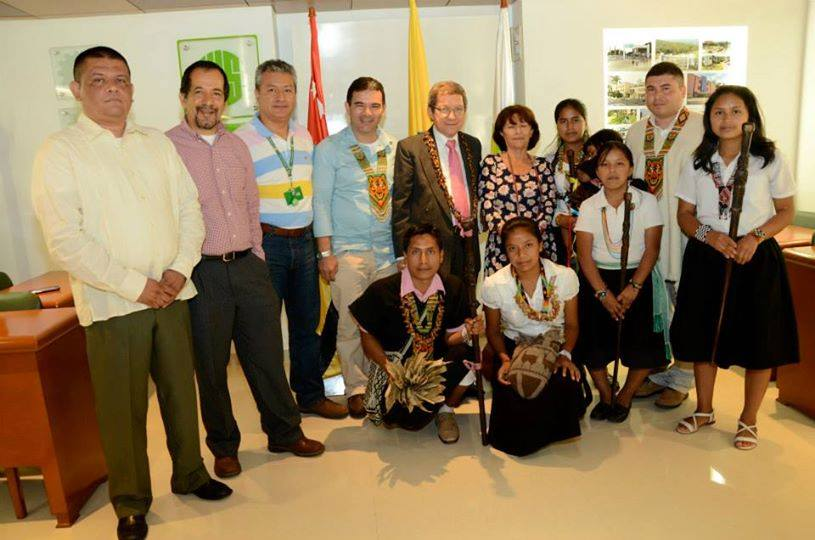
Guane people meeting at the Industrial University of Santander

== Current Guane culture ==
Today the Guane people continue to exist. There are no known speakers of Guane´s original language, however, their culture has evolved and is still practiced. For example, museums around Santander preserve the culture and claim it as Santandereana Heritage, a woman named Doña Ana Felicia Alquichire continues to make ceramics in the traditional Guane style, and many Santandereanos sing songs about their Guane heritage every day. The Guane identity remains one of the primary identities in the towns of Barichara and Guane, with at least 86 persons self-identifying as such.

The Guane also continue their tradition of gastronomy by preparing of 'hormigas culonas' which translated to big butt ants, arepas, and chicha.

== Municipalities belonging to Guane territory ==
The Guane inhabited the area of central and south Santander, around the Chicamocha Canyon and a small part of Boyacá.

Name	Department	Altitude (m) urban centre	Map
Guane	Santander	1336	
Aratoca	Santander	1800	
Cabrera	Santander	980	
Coromoro	Santander	1518	
Curití	Santander	1409	
Encino	Santander	1850	
Guapotá	Santander	1534	
Güepsa (shared with Muisca and Yarigui)	Santander	1540	
Jordán	Santander	425	
Mogotes	Santander	1700	
Ocamonte	Santander	1398	
Oiba	Santander	1420	
Palmar	Santander	1200	
Páramo	Santander	1200	
Pinchote	Santander	1131	
San Gil	Santander	1117	
San Joaquín	Santander	1950	
Los Santos	Santander	1310	
Suaita	Santander	1700	
Valle de San José	Santander	1250	
Villanueva	Santander	1450	
San José de Pare	Boyacá	1545	
Santana	Boyacá	1550	

== See also ==
- Muisca
- Conquest of the Guane
- Muzo, U'wa
- Guayupe, Lache, Yarigui
