= Charalá =

Coordinates: 6°15′N 73°05′W

- Municipality and town
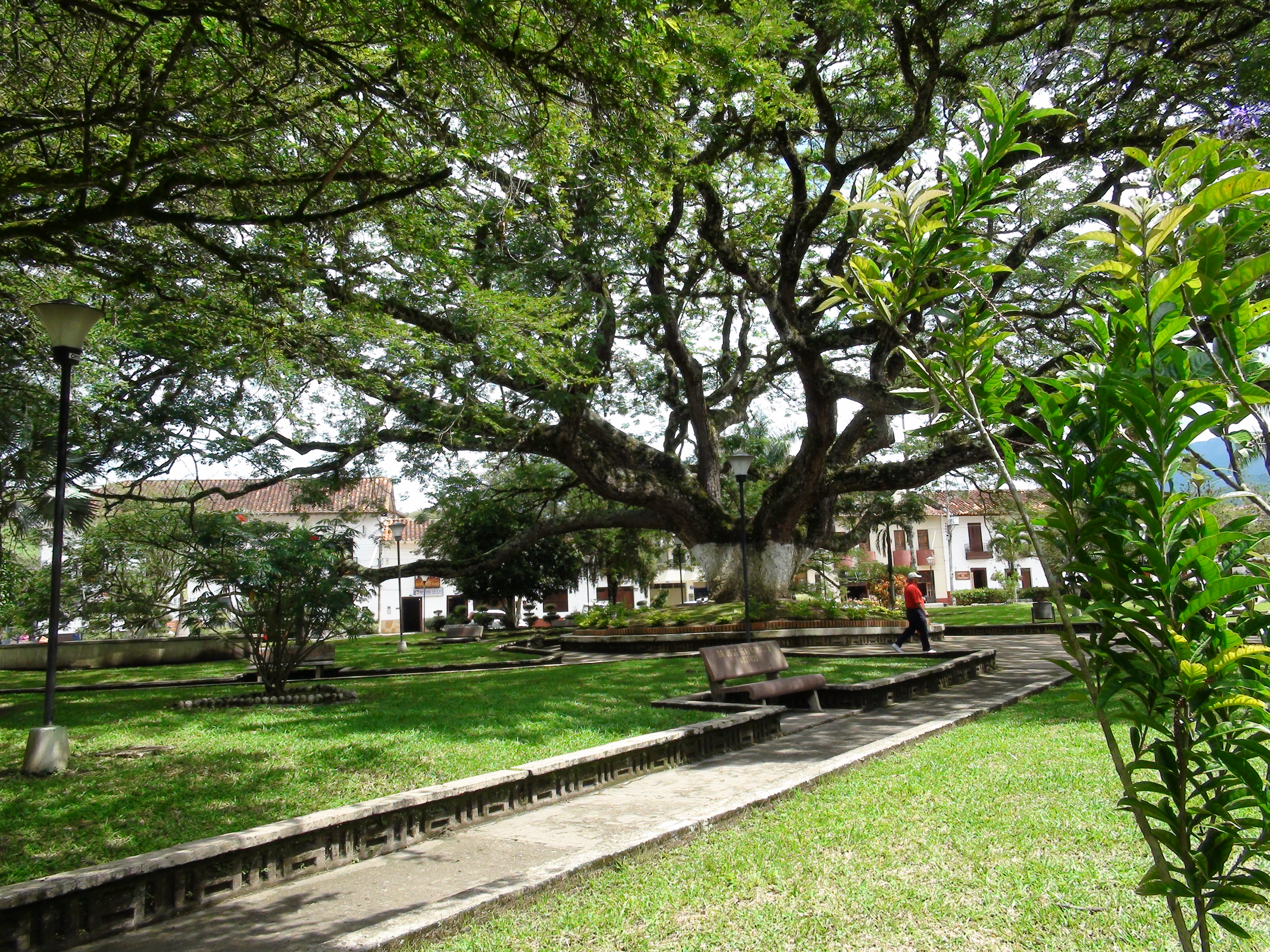
- Central square and park Charalá

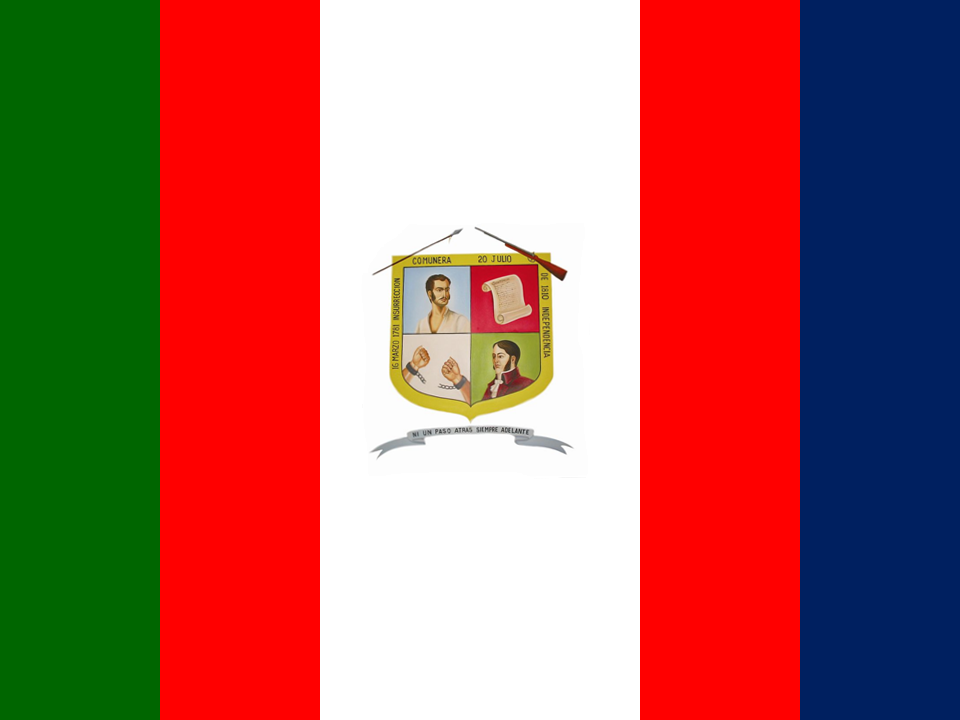
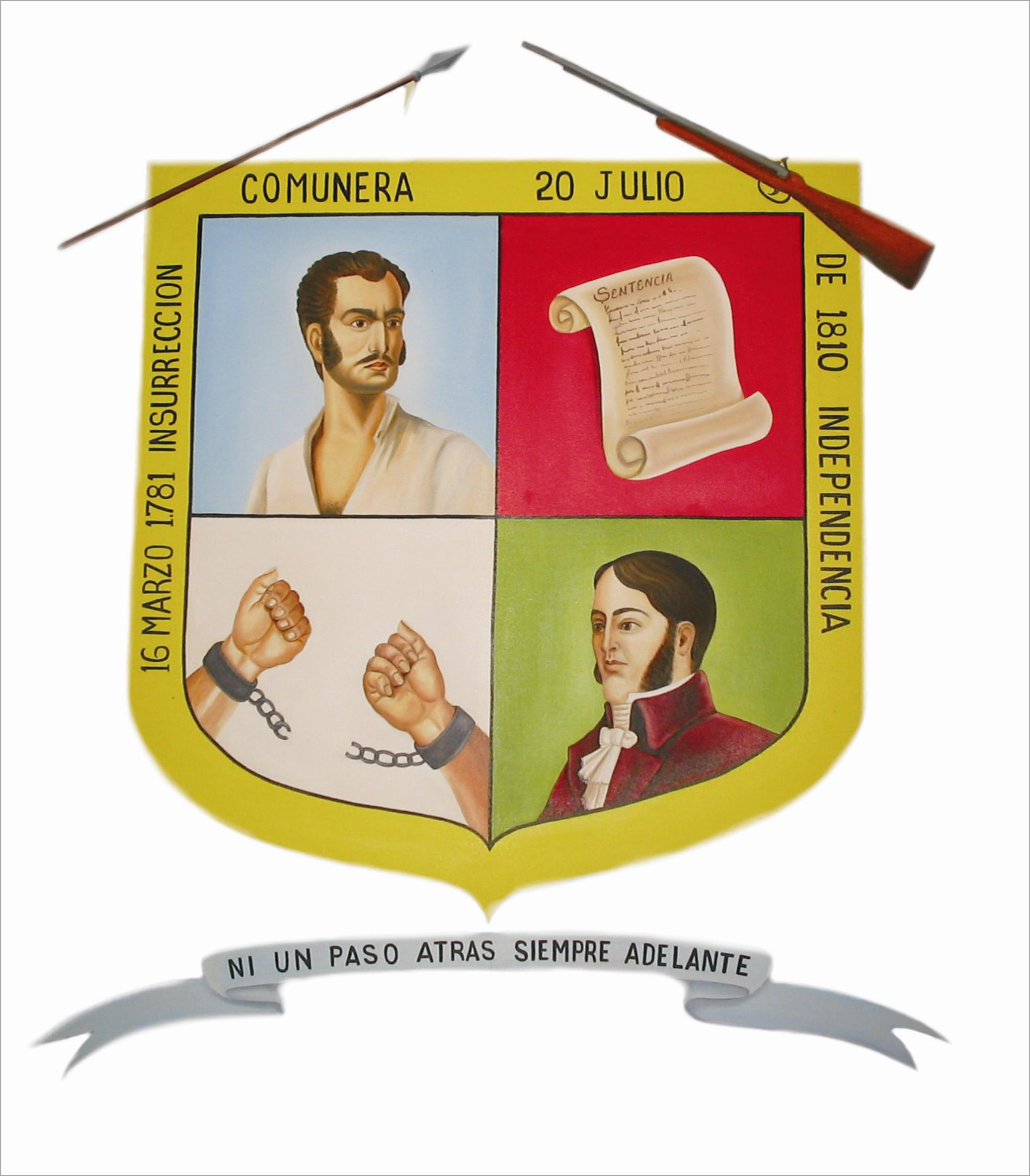
- Flag Coat of arms

- Location of the municipality and town of Charalá in the Santander Department of Colombia
- Country: Colombia
- Department: Santander Department
- Province: Guanentá Province
- Founded: 23 July 1540
- Founder: Martín Galeano

Government
  - Mayor: Edilsón Arenas Silva (2020-2023)

Area
  - Municipality and town: 411 km^{2} (159 sq mi)
  - Urban: 0.7 km^{2} (0.27 sq mi)
- Elevation: 1,290 m (4,230 ft)

Population (2015)
  - Municipality and town: 10,540
  - Density: 25.6/km^{2} (66.4/sq mi)
  - Urban: 5,791
- Time zone: UTC-5 (Colombia Standard Time)
- Website: Official website

Charalá is a town and municipality in the south of the department of Santander in northeastern Colombia. Its antipode is located within the capital of Indonesia, Jakarta.

The municipality borders the municipalities Encino and Coromoro in the east, Oiba, Confines and Suaita in the west, Páramo, Ocamonte and Mogotes in the north and in the south Gámbita and Duitama, the latter in the department of Boyacá.

== Climate ==
Charalá has a tropical rainforest climate (Köppen: Af) with consistent temperatures, cool nights, and abundant rainfall.

Climate data for Charalá, elevation 1,350 m (4,430 ft), (1981–2010)
Month	Jan	Feb	Mar	Apr	May	Jun	Jul	Aug	Sep	Oct	Nov	Dec	Year
Mean daily maximum °C (°F)	28.8 (83.8)	29.1 (84.4)	29.0 (84.2)	28.4 (83.1)	28.2 (82.8)	28.0 (82.4)	28.0 (82.4)	28.2 (82.8)	28.2 (82.8)	28.0 (82.4)	27.9 (82.2)	28.3 (82.9)	28.3 (82.9)
Daily mean °C (°F)	21.6 (70.9)	21.7 (71.1)	21.5 (70.7)	21.4 (70.5)	21.4 (70.5)	21.3 (70.3)	21.1 (70.0)	21.2 (70.2)	21.1 (70.0)	21.2 (70.2)	21.3 (70.3)	21.4 (70.5)	21.3 (70.3)
Mean daily minimum °C (°F)	15.4 (59.7)	15.7 (60.3)	16.0 (60.8)	16.4 (61.5)	16.7 (62.1)	16.3 (61.3)	15.9 (60.6)	15.8 (60.4)	15.7 (60.3)	16.1 (61.0)	16.5 (61.7)	16.1 (61.0)	16.0 (60.8)
Average precipitation mm (inches)	101.9 (4.01)	159.8 (6.29)	213.7 (8.41)	304.7 (12.00)	291.3 (11.47)	190.1 (7.48)	170.0 (6.69)	210.5 (8.29)	267.4 (10.53)	352.4 (13.87)	264.5 (10.41)	147.5 (5.81)	2,614.3 (102.93)
Average precipitation days	13	14	19	23	25	21	22	23	24	26	22	16	243
Average relative humidity (%)	80	80	81	84	84	84	83	83	83	84	84	83	83
Mean monthly sunshine hours	213.9	177.8	161.2	141.0	142.6	141.0	161.2	161.2	147.0	158.1	165.0	195.3	1,965.3
Mean daily sunshine hours	6.9	6.3	5.2	4.7	4.6	4.7	5.2	5.2	4.9	5.1	5.5	6.3	5.4
Source: Instituto de Hidrologia Meteorologia y Estudios Ambientales

== Etymology ==
The name Charalá is Chibcha, the language of the Muisca and was given to honour the Guane cacique of the village; "Chalala".

== History ==
Before the arrival of the Spanish in the area, the Santander department was inhabited by the Guane. Charalá was located at the border of Guane territory and the Muisca Confederation of which it formed an independent unity.

Modern Charalá was founded by one of the conquistadors who was part in the Spanish conquest of the Muisca; Martín Galeano, on July 23, 1540.

== Economy ==
Main economical activities in the municipality are agriculture (coffee, sugar cane and maize) and marble mining.

== Born in Charalá ==
- José Acevedo y Gómez, independence hero of Colombia
- José Antonio Galán, was a Neogranadine historical. He was the leader of the Comuneros insurrection in 1781.

== Trivia ==
- Charalá is the type locality for the Santander poison frog (Andinobates virolinensis)

== Gallery ==
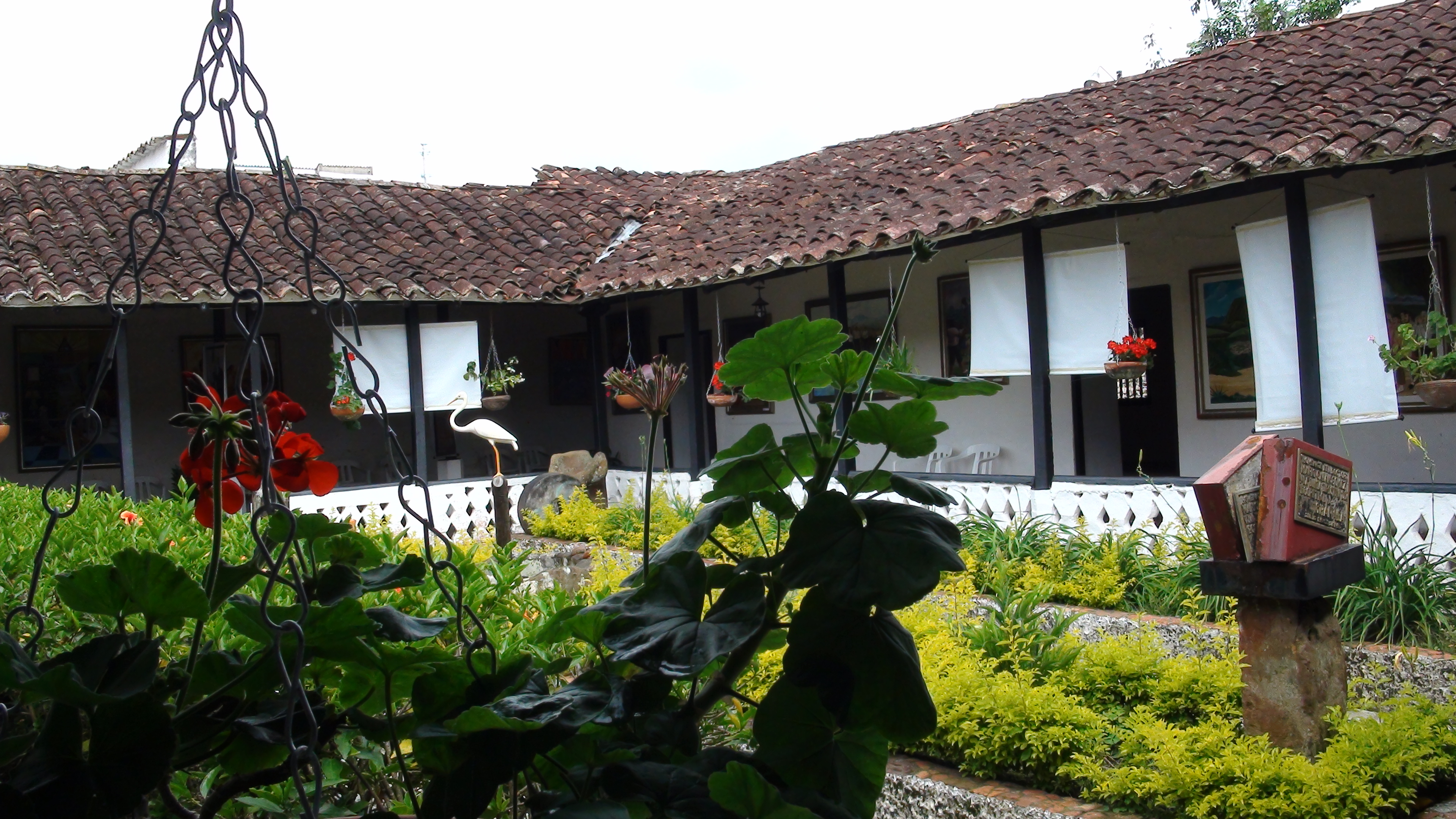
Casa de la Cultura

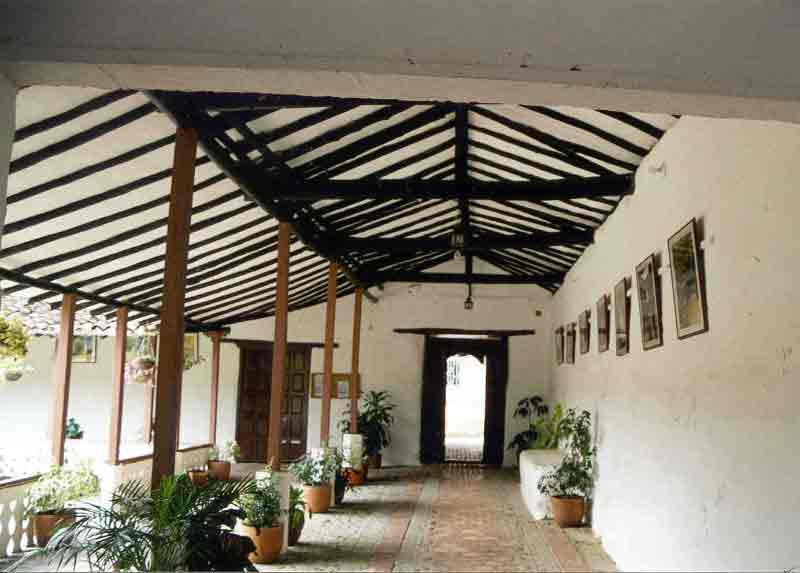
Colonial house

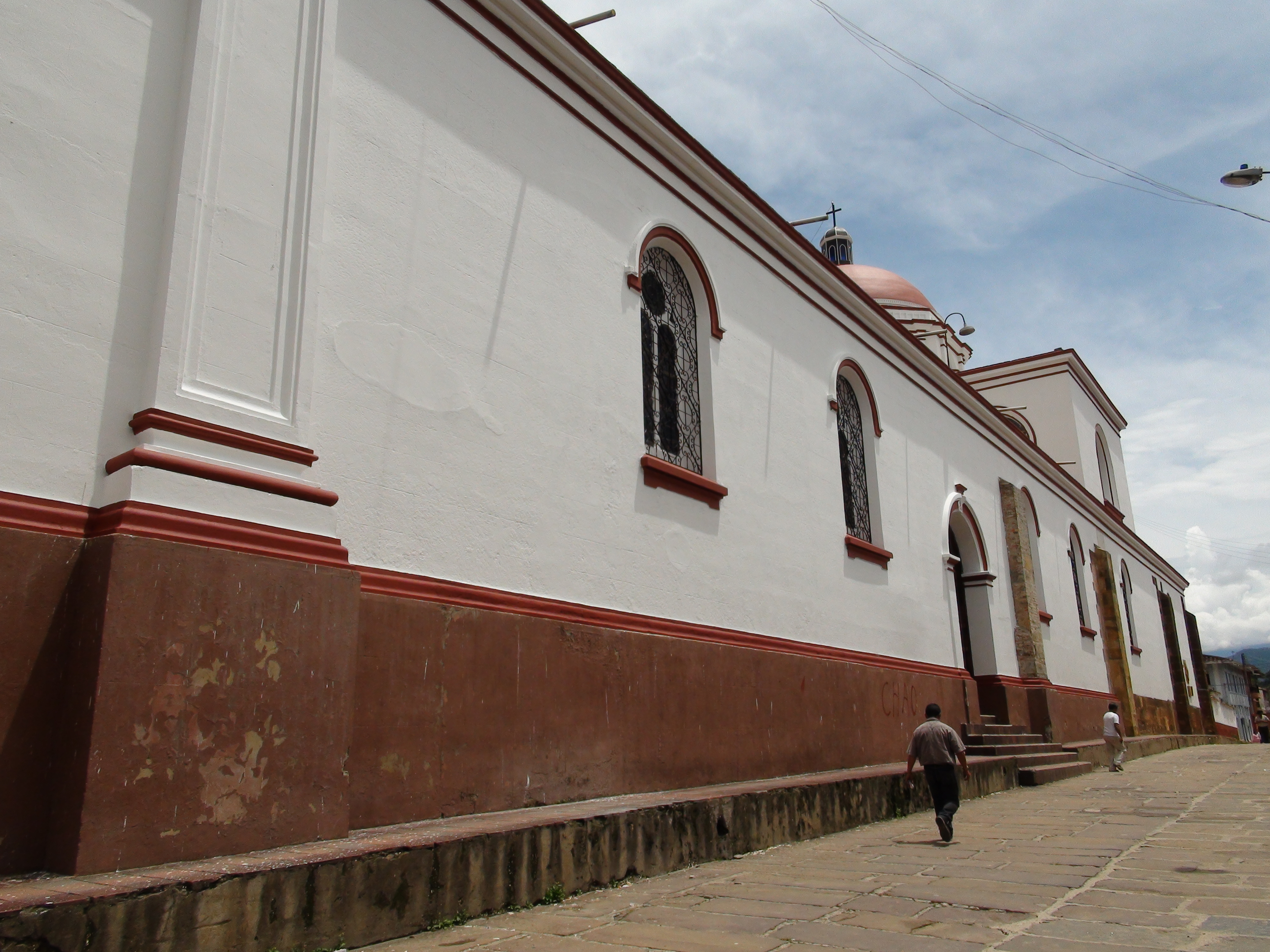
Iglesia Nuestra Señora de Monguí

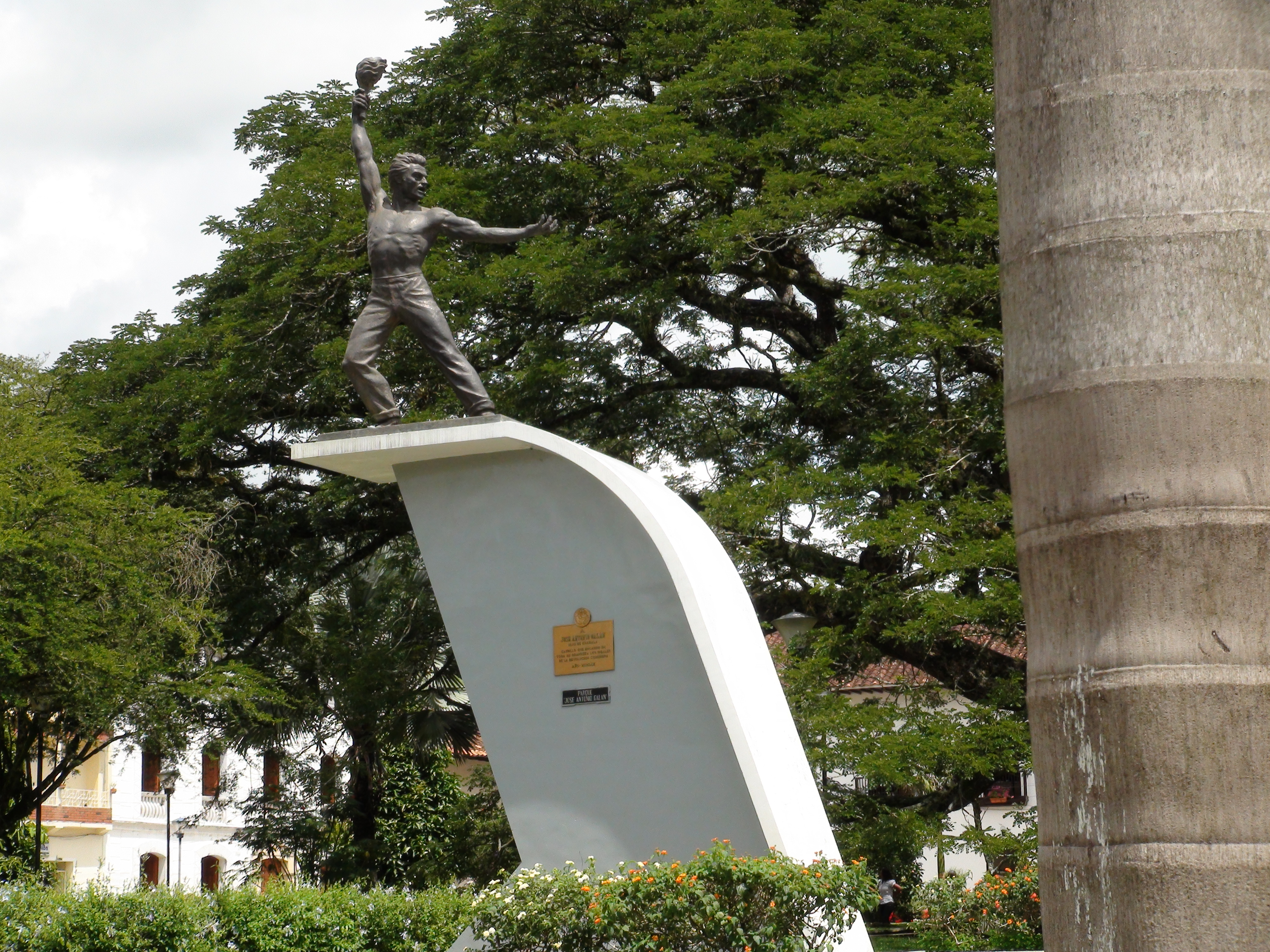
Statue José Antonio Galán

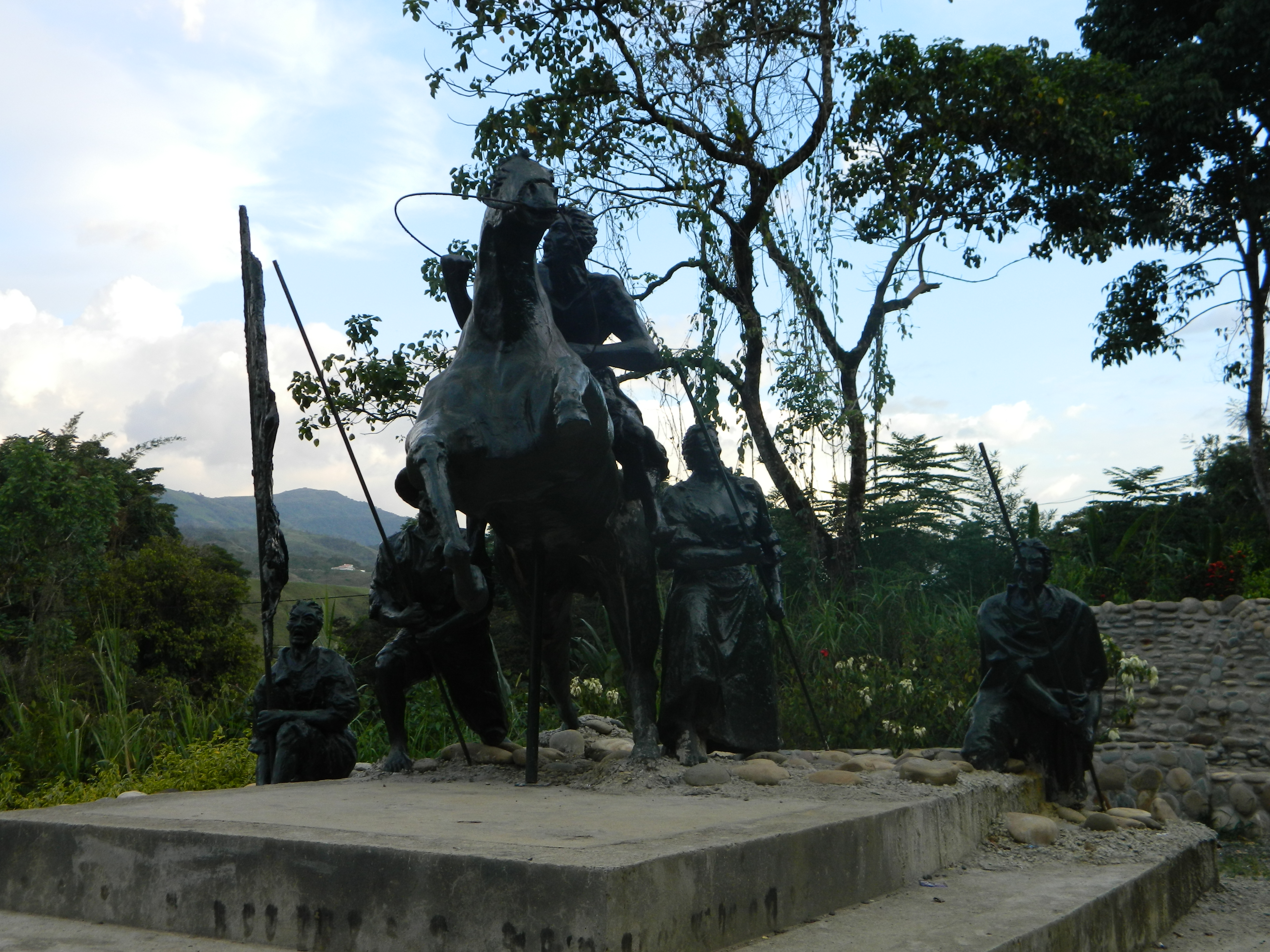
Statue Simón Bolívar

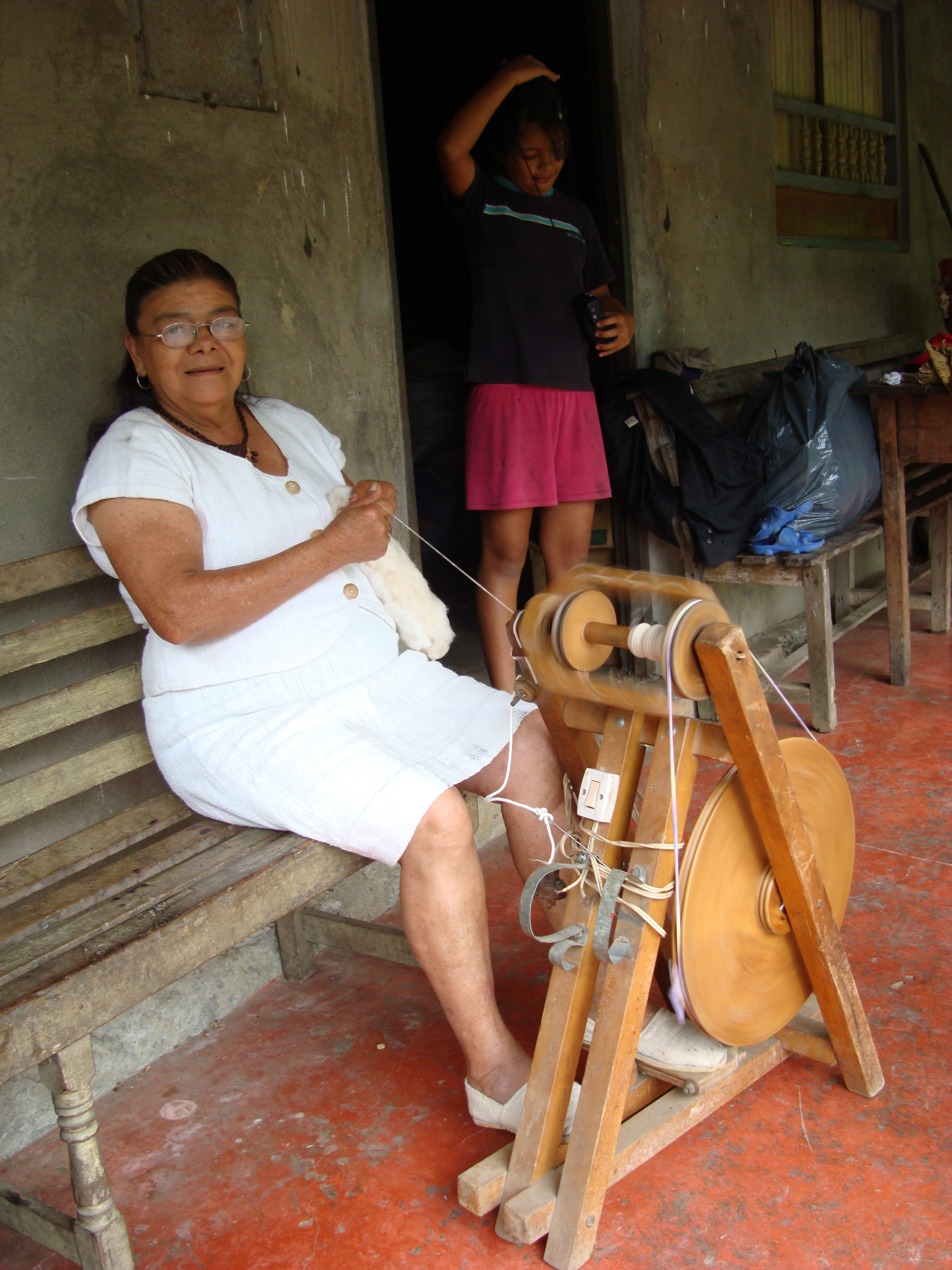
Weaving activity
