= Guanentá Province =

Guanentá Province is a province in Santander Department, Colombia. The province was named after the Amerindian Chief Guanentá, leader of the Guanes, who were the original inhabitants of the region.

== Municipalities ==
Guanentá Province is divided into seventeen municipalities:

- Aratoca
- Barichara
- Charalá
- Curití
- San Gil
- Socorro
- Mogotes

=== Other Towns ===
- Coromoro
- Encino
- Jordán
- Ocamonte
- Onzaga
- Pinchote
- San Joaquin
- Valley of San Jose
- Villanueva

== Hydrography ==
- Fonce River starts in the south of this province and crosses it from the south to the north west, gathering to his river steps such as: pienta, the mogoticos, broken of deer, and others, passes through towns such as Charalá, San Jose Valley (Valle de San José), Ocamonte, happens through territories of wooded hills. The urban helmet of San Gil, through near Pinchote, and ends to Suarez River.
- Pienta Fonce River is one of the main effluents of the Fonce River
- Taquiza Fonce River: another one of the main tributaries of the Fonce River
- Mogoticos River: this tributary of the Fonce River, as its name indicates, it comes from the Guanentino wooded hill municipality, and ends to the Fonce River in the heat of the park Gallineral in San Gil.
- Broken of Deer: this gorge comes from the municipality of Paramo, and ends at the Fonce River, near the bridge of the valley, that unites San Gil and Paramo with the municipality of San Jose Valley (Valle de San José).
