= Julián Lombana =

Colombian architect (1939–1916)

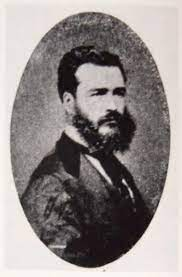
- Born: Julián Lombana Herrera; 1839; Bogotá Province, New Granada
- Died: 1916; Bogotá, Colombia
- Occupation: Architect
- Buildings: The Casa de Nariño; Basilica of Our Lady of Lourdes; Central Cemetery of Bogotá; Palacio Liévano

Julián Lombana Herrera was a Colombian architect, standing out for being one of the architects in charge of the construction of the Casa de Nariño. Lombana was known as the cement surgeon during his career, he intervened in around 28 constructions, including the Cathedral of Our Lady of Lourdes in Bogotá, the Palacio Liévano, the Central Cemetery of Bogotá and the founding building of Bancolombia.
