= Oiba =

- Municipality and town
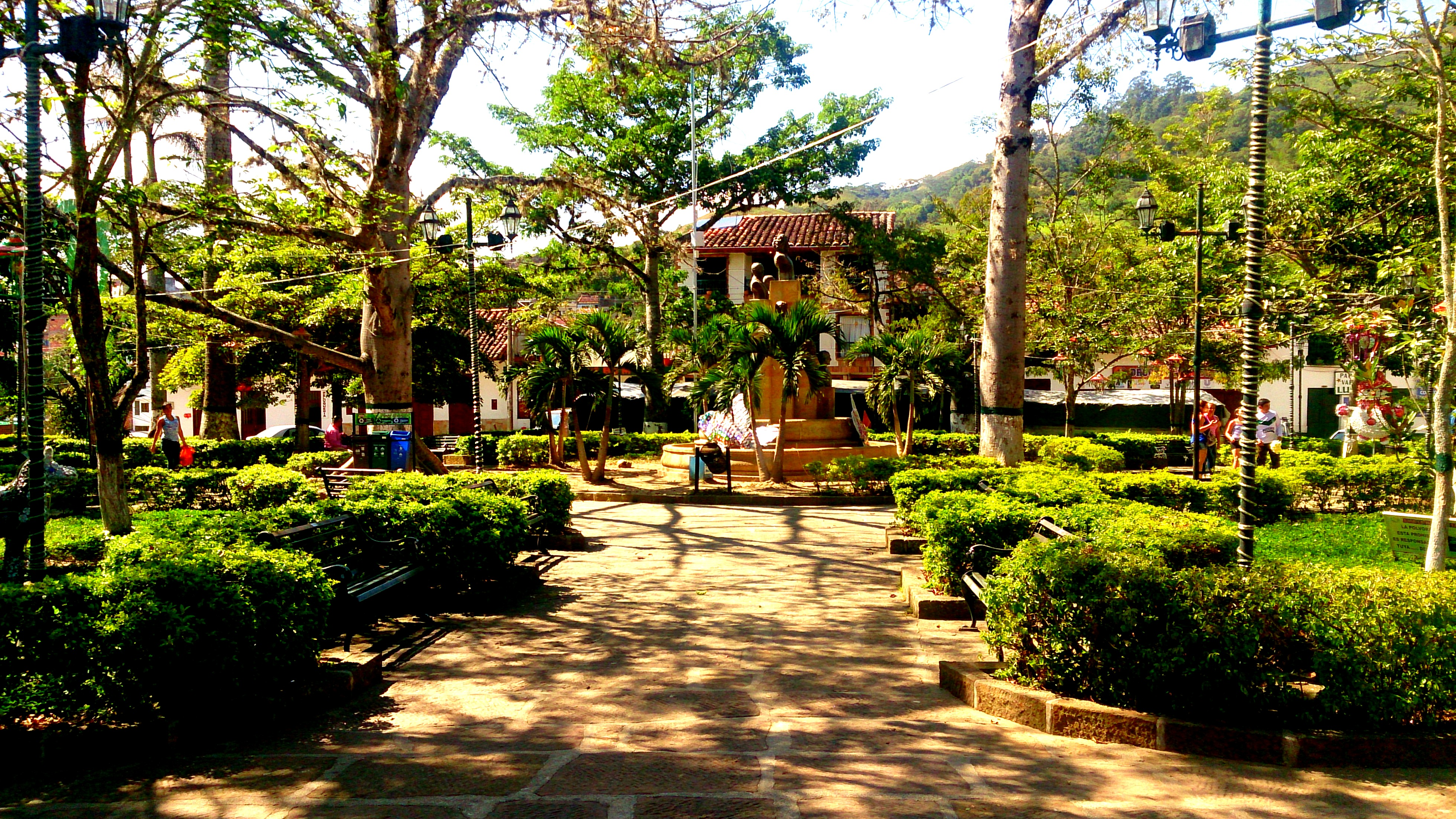

- Location of the municipality and town of Oiba in the Santander Department of Colombia
- Coordinates: 6°16′N 73°18′W
- Country: Colombia
- Department: Santander Department
- Province: Comunera Province
- Founded: 28 February 1540
- Founder: Martín Galeano

Government
  - Mayor: Carlos Miguel Durán Rángel (2016-2019)

Area
  - Municipality and town: 287 km^{2} (111 sq mi)
  - Urban: 3 km^{2} (1.2 sq mi)
- Elevation: 1,420 m (4,660 ft)

Population (2015)
  - Municipality and town: 11,738
  - Density: 40.9/km^{2} (106/sq mi)
  - Urban: 5,547
- Time zone: UTC-5 (Colombia Standard Time)
- Website: Official website

Oiba (Spanish pronunciation: [ˈojβa]) is a town and municipality in the Santander Department in northeastern Colombia. Oiba borders Guapotá and Confines in the north; Charalá in the east; Guadalupe and Guapotá in the west; and Suaita in the south. The department capital Bucaramanga is 151 kilometres (94 mi) to the north and the national capital Bogotá 270 kilometres (170 mi) to the south.

== History ==
In the time before the Spanish conquest of the Muisca, Oiba was inhabited by the Guane. The modern town was conquered and founded on February 28, 1540, by Martín Galeano.

== Economy ==
Oiba is an agricultural community that cultivates mainly coffee, sugarcane, maize, yuca and tree tomatoes.
