= Barichara =

Coordinates: 6°38′N 73°14′W

- Municipality and town
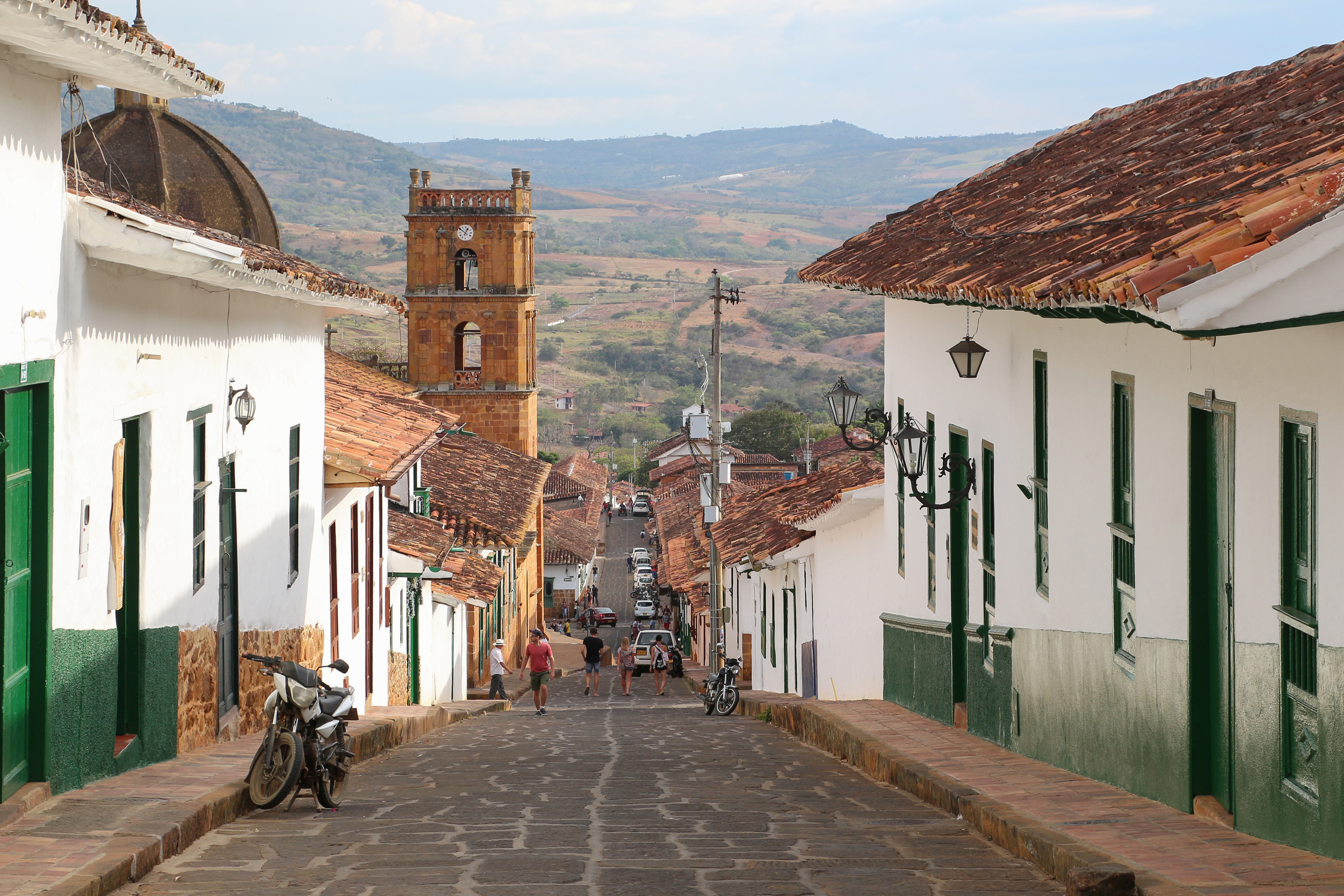
- Street in Barichara

- Flag Coat of arms

- Location of the municipality and town of Barichara in the Santander Department of Colombia.
- Country: Colombia
- Department: Santander Department
- Founded: January 25, 1705
- Founder: Francisco Pradilla y Ayerbe

Area
  - Total: 134 km^{2} (52 sq mi)

Population (2005)
  - Total: 7,063
  - Density: 52.7/km^{2} (137/sq mi)
- Demonym(s): Baricharas & Patiamarillos
- Time zone: UTC-5 (Colombia Standard Time)
- Website: www.barichara-santander.gov.co

Barichara is a town and municipality in the Santander Department in northeastern Colombia.

In 2010, in recognition of its history, architecture, and touristic potential, Barichara was declared a Colombian Pueblo Patrimonio (heritage town). It is amongst only 11 municipalities nationwide that were selected to be part of the Red Turística de Pueblos Patrimonio original cohort.

The town's unique, colorful architecture was an inspiration for the settings in the hit 2021 Disney animated feature Encanto.

== Legend: The Miracle of the Stone ==
It occurred in the early 18th century, in the year 1702 according to the legend, when a peasant from the region encountered the Virgin Mary. The apparition took place on a stone where her image appeared clearly carved. The miracle spread, and the peasants turned the rock into an object of worship. The villagers decided to build a church, though the local priest at the time did not believe it. The parish, erected in 1751, was initially named Vare-Florence, then Vara-echada, and finally Barichara, which means "Place of Rest" in the Guane language of the Guane people. The Church did not accept the existence of the image on the stone, yet the miracle remains embedded in its history. Barichara rises from stone. Its streets, houses, temples, and especially the cemetery—renowned for its grilles and windows—are constructed with yellow stone. The Cathedral of the Immaculate Conception, commemorating the Virgin of the Rock, is a unique structure: supported by 10 carved monolithic columns, each measuring 5 meters in height and 70 centimeters in width.

== Tourism ==
The historic center of Barichara was declared a national monument on August 3, 1978, recognized as "a prime example of informal urban development in the Andalusian style, maintaining strong preservation of its original 18th-century layout, late-colonial architecture, and the distinctive ambiance of that era." In Barichara, visitors can explore:

- The house of former President Aquileo Parra.
- The Emilio Pradilla González Cultural Center.
- The chapels of San Antonio and Santa Bárbara.
- The Municipal Hall.
- The viewpoint (mirador).
- Salto del Mico (a waterfall).
- Chorreras Bathing Area.
- Parque de las Aguas (Water Park).
- The new library.
- "Puente Grande," one of Colombia’s five most renowned stone-and-lime mortar bridges.

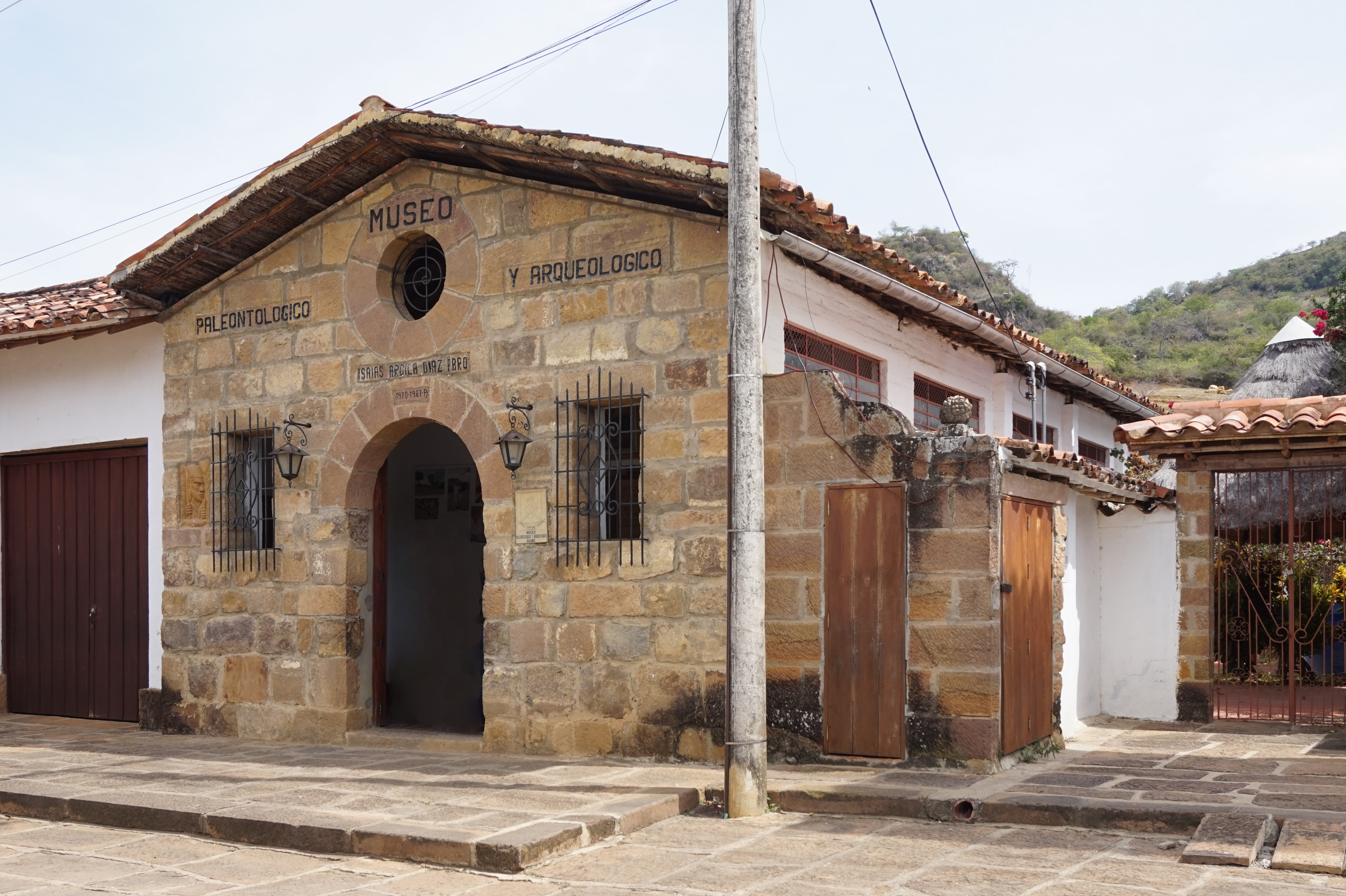
Archaeological Museum about the Guane People in Guane, Santader

Located 9 kilometers away, frozen in time and history, lies Guane—founded by Martín Galeano in 1540. Here, visitors can admire the Archaeological Museum, the Church of Santa Lucía, and other architectural treasures.
