= José Acevedo y Gómez =

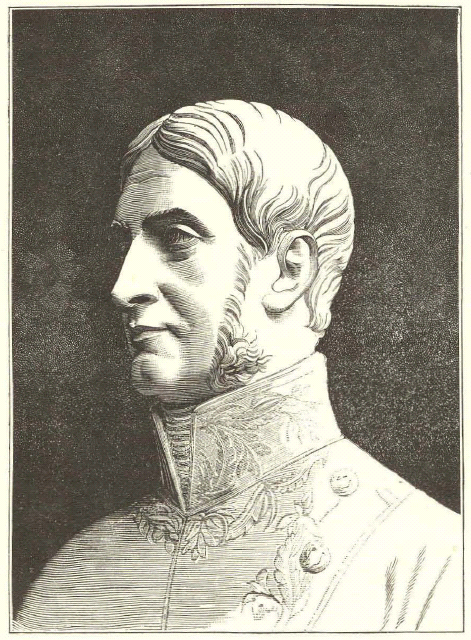
- Born: José Acevedo y Gómez; 1773; Charalá, Viceroyalty of New Granada
- Died: May 1817 (aged 44); Caquetá, Viceroyalty of New Granada

José Acevedo y Gómez (1773 in Charalá, Santander – May 1817, in Caquetá) was an independence hero of Colombia. With an educational background of grammar and philosophy, he became a highly skillful orator and political figure, attaining the position of the Attorney General. He generated a vast wealth through his trading activities. He was honored with a bust in the patio of the Palacio Liévano.

== Early life ==
Born in 1773 in Charalá, he was baptized in the Monguí parish. He was descended from noble Spanish families on both sides. He studied at the Our Lady of the Rosary University. While he read the classics and liberal philosophers of the eighteenth century, he did not pursue a degree. Instead, he developed skills in trade. He evolved as a very good orator, and with this skill he could promote freedom movements of the country.

In the field of business trading, which he operated from 1810 from Bogotá, his cousin Miguel Tadeo Gomez Duran (in 1810, Gomez Duran was also an administrator of a royal trading company in Socorro) was his partner. He was considered a rebellious merchant.

== Career ==
He moved to San Gil where he held various public offices. In Bogotá, he delivered his oratory, "The Tribune of Pueblo". Here, he prospered as a trader, while training in law and philosophy.

In 1808, he was appointed Perpetual Regidor of the Cabildo of Santa Fe. The same year, Spain was invaded by the French, and Acevedo participated in the oath of allegiance to King Ferdinand VII, but also stated the need to form a Governing Board. During 1809, he engaged in conspiracies seeking to depose the Viceroy Antonio José Amar y Borbón, to form an independent government. He became interested in the emerging proposals for the emancipation of the American colonies and decided to begin organizing meetings with other intellectuals and leaders of the city which culminated with the Cry of Independence of Colombia of July 20, 1810, when street riots began, turning chaotic and ineffective. Popular leaders proclaimed their tribute to Acevedo, trying to harness his excellent oratory skills, and he addressed the crowd at the central square of the city with a speech that fueled the need to seize the moment to organize as an autonomous government. He stated:

"Santafereños: If you lose the moment of effervescence and heat, if you let this opportunity escape single and happy, within twelve hours shall be treated as insurgents: behold the dungeons, shackles and chains that await you."

Along with six other patriots such as Camilo Torres Tenorio, Francisco Jose de Caldas, Jorge Tadeo y Lozano, he met on 20 July 1810 and proclaimed the independence of the Viceroyalty of New Granada. They had gathered in the main plaza of the country's capital city, Bogotá, in an open-air meeting. The seven patriots of the group were known as the "Colombian Founding Fathers". On the morning of 21 July 1810, a document was drafted by Antonio José known as the “Act of Independence” and was signed by the members of the group. This document clearly spelt out the autonomous status of New Grenada to be governed under Federal system. The autonomy was to enable the people to govern themselves through a constitution. Following this declaration there were agitations and riots between rival groups of people. This group's decision called the junta proclamation stated that “it no longer recognized the Supreme Regency Council, marking a decisive moment: no corporation or person located in or hailing from the peninsula have authority over these lands except for Ferdinand VII.”

During the period known as "Patria Boba", Acevedo participated in the independence rebellions of Cundinamarca and Tunja. He held positions in government during the Patria Boba. But when the forces of General Pablo Morillo regained much of United Provinces of New Granada, Acevedo took refuge in the jungles of Caquetá. While there, he fell ill and died in May 1817.
