= Valle de San José =

Coordinates: 6.4475°N 73.1436°W

Valle San José
- Municipality and town
- Flag

- Location of the municipality and town of Valle San José in the Santander Department of Colombia.
- Coordinates: 6.4475°, -73.1436°
- Country: Colombia
- Department: Santander Department

Area
  - Total: 99 km^{2} (38 sq mi)
- Elevation: 1,250 m (4,100 ft)

Population (2015)
  - Total: 4,670
  - Density: 47.17/km^{2} (122.2/sq mi)
- Time zone: UTC-5 (Colombia Standard Time)

Valle San José is a town and municipality in the Santander Department in northeastern Colombia. It is located in the Guanentá Province. It has a population of 4670 by 2015.
