= Casa de Nariño =

Official residence and workplace of the President of Colombia

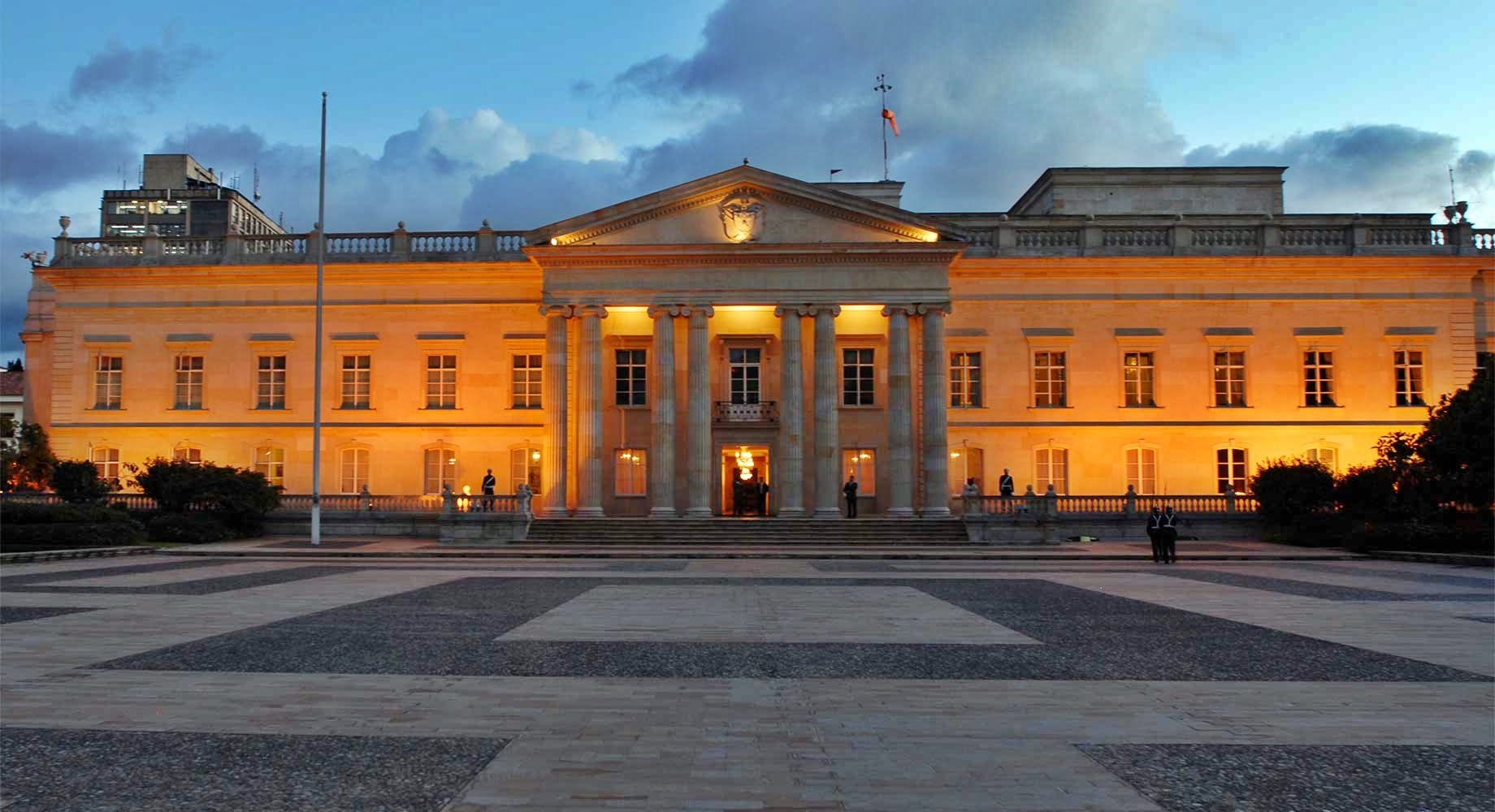
- The executive residence's northern facade with a columned portico facing the North Lawn and Nuñez Square

- Location within Colombia

General information
- Architectural style: Neoclassical
- Location: Carrera 8 A Number 7-26, Bogotá, D.C.
- Coordinates: 4°35′44″N 74°4′39″W
- Current tenants: Abelardo de la Espriella, President of Colombia and First family
- Construction started: September 4, 1906; 120 years ago
- Completed: July 20, 1908; 118 years ago

Design and construction
- Architects: Gastón Lelarge; Julián Lombana
- Casa de Nariño
- Designated: August 7, 1908

The Casa de Nariño (Spanish pronunciation: ['kasa ðe na'riɲo]), literally the House of Nariño, is the official residence and principal workplace of the President of Colombia. It houses the main office of the executive branch and is located in the capital city of Bogotá, Colombia. It was dedicated in 1908 after being constructed on the site of the house where Antonio Nariño was born. The design was made by architects Gastón Lelarge, a French-born former pupil of Charles Garnier, and Julián Lombana.

In 1980, the structure was rededicated after the construction of additions. The building also houses works of art and furnishings from different periods of the history of art. Its garden houses the Observatorio Astronómico de Bogotá, designed by the Capuchin friar-architect Domingo de Petrés and built in 1802–03. Historically, the building has been called "Palacio de Nariño" but given Bogota's close ties to Washington, it is now common to hear "Casa de Nariño". Both versions are equally acceptable culturally.

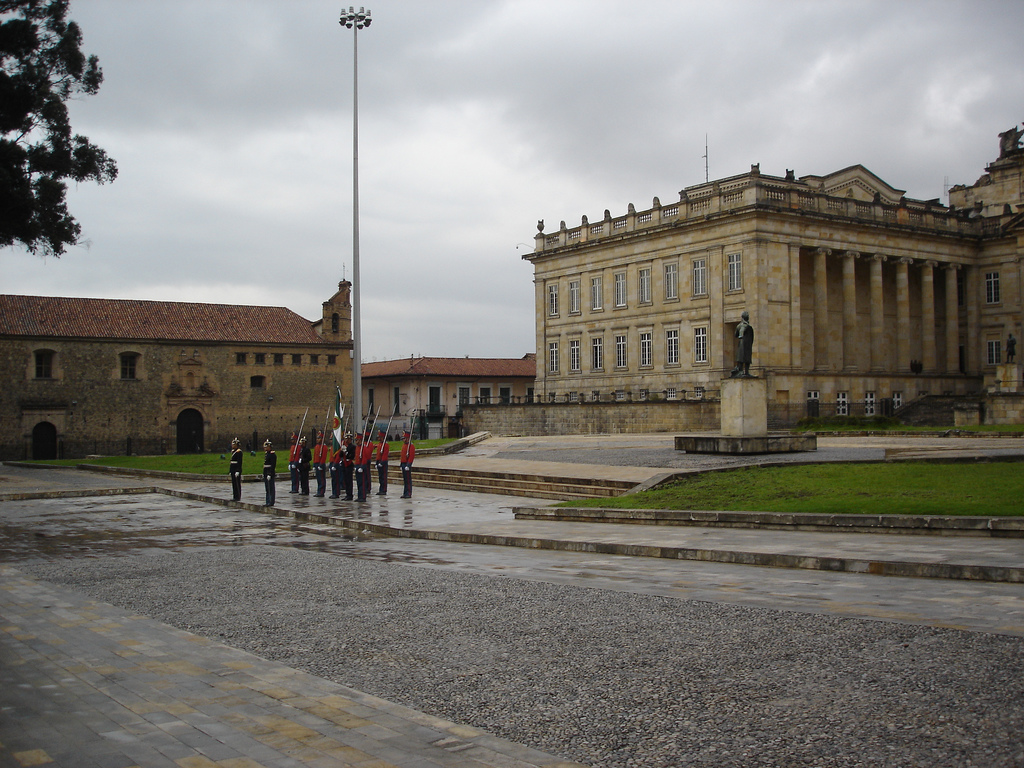
Changing the Guard, cambio de guardia in the Plaza de Armas

== History ==
The grand house, located halfway along the first Carrera Street, was bought by Don Vicente Nariño in 1754 for 5,200 "patacones". There Vicente Nariño and Catalina Álvarez lived with their children for approximately 30 years, until Nariño died. It was then when his wife and children received it in inheritance according to Nariño's will in 1778.

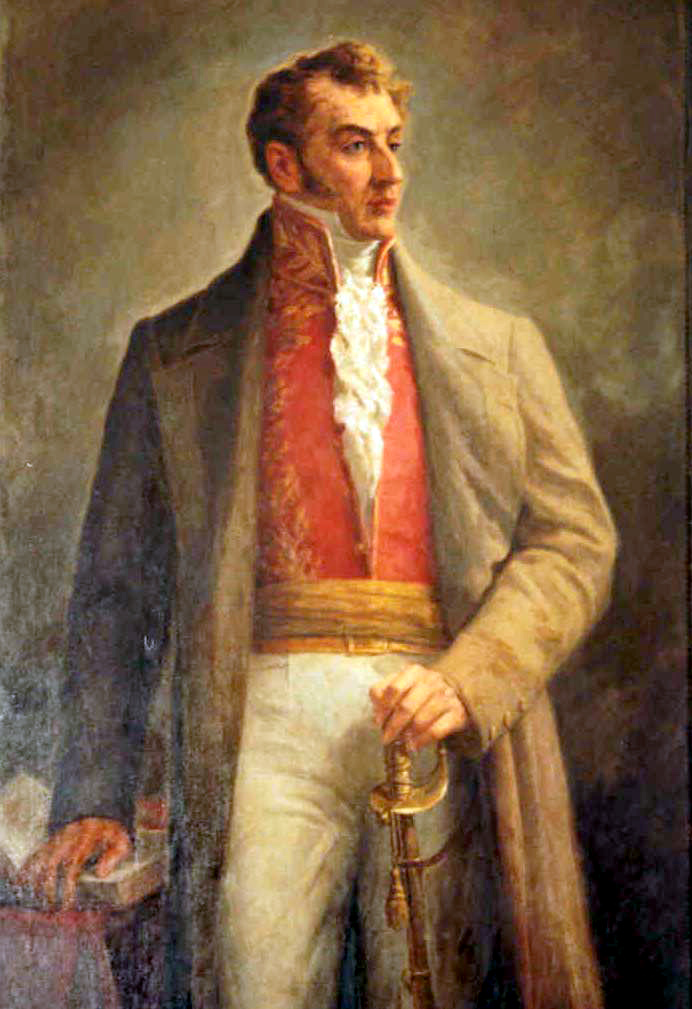
Nariño's portrait in the presidential office.

On April 9, 1765, the third of the eight children of the Nariño family was born, Antonio Nariño, one of the Colombian Independence's national heroes. After the Nariño family, the property was acquired by a number of owners, including the daughter of the former administrator of the Colombian Mint, Doña Juana Inés Prieto y Ricaurte. The first presidential palace from where Simón Bolivar worked after Colombian Independence was the old viceregal palace (Palacio de los Virreyes), located in the west side of Plaza de Bolívar square of Bogotá in the current position of the Palacio Liévano. On November 16, 1827, one of the most intense earthquakes of the city's history took place, which left the palace partially destroyed. Because of this, Simon Bolívar authorized the purchase of the San Carlos Palace from Juan Manuel Arrubla, and the transfer of the presidential office and the official residence to that property.

On October 23, 1885, President Rafael Núñez, purchased the Nariño house in order to convert it into a presidential palace in observance of its beauty, significance in history, and its proximity to the National Capitol. The presidents stayed there until 1892, during the periods of Rafael Nuñez and Carlos Holguin Mallarino, and under the temporary government of the Generals Eliseo Payán and José María Campo Serrano. Subsequently, the presidential residence was moved again to the San Carlos Palace, while the Nariño house was used as headquarters of the War Ministry, the National Archive, and the National University's faculty of Mathematics. On April 9, 1906, the General Rafael Reyes hired the French architect, Gastón Lelarge, and a local one, Julián Lombana to demolish parts and rebuild the former house. The architects extended the dimensions of the property to Eighth Road and restructured the inner part of the building by creating two levels. They also designed wide halls and improved the façade with carved stones. The complete ornamentation works were carried out by the Swiss sculptor Luigi Ramelli. On July 20, 1908, the government building was officially returned to the Casa de Nariño or Palace of the Carrera (Palacio de la Carrera). During the government of Eduardo Santos the third level and the terrace roof were built, along with a heliport. The government office remained in the Casa de Nariño until 1954, when the General Gustavo Rojas Pinilla commanded it to be moved to the chancellery and the presidency came back to the San Carlos Palace.

== Remodeling ==
In 1972 an extension and a remodeling of the building were proposed, these changes were made during the presidency of Alfonso López Michelsen, between 1974 and 1978. the remodeling works kept the seventh Carrera façade in its original form, but the remaining parts of the building were redesigned including the gardens, the National Observatory, the Plaza de Armas (Parades Square), the neoclassical style portico and the west wing that left the palace totally isolated from the other buildings. The restoration works were carried out by the architect Fernando Alsina, who was an auditor of the Ministry of public works. In order to make a complete restoration and extension of the palace it was necessary to demolish some nearby buildings such as the house of the Botanical Expedition, the mail administration and the house of Camilo Torres, among others. The total cost of the works was 250 million Colombian pesos.

During this epoch a good number of buildings near to the Casa de Nariño were declared as 'National Monuments of Colombia', including the Astronomic Observatory, the National Capitol, The Echeverri Palace, The Church of San Agustin, the Claustro de San Agustin, the Church of Santa Clara, the college of San Bartolomé, Bolívar Square and the historic sector of La Candelaria. To move the presidency back to the Casa de Nariño took around ten months between 1979 and 1980 and its re-inauguration was made during the government of Julio César Turbay. On April 1, 1979, the bank of the Republic launched to the market the first series of 1000 pesos bills portraying the image of the Casa de Nariño in the seal. On December 11, 1979, the first broadcast of coloured television in Colombian was made with a speech by the former president Turbay followed by images of the new façade of the palace.

During the inauguration of Álvaro Uribe Vélez on 7 August 2002, a homemade rocket crashed into the west façade's cornice, injuring three soldiers as part of a series of terrorist attacks across Bogota that left 13 people dead. The consequences of the impact were not major and were rapidly repaired, but because of that the security had to be increased in the zone . On March 9, 2007, the robbery of the picture of "El Cóndor" was reported. It was painted in 1971 by the master Alejandro Obregón and normally decorated the ministry council room in the palace. A few hours later it was discovered that a sergeant belonging to the presidential security body had stolen it and that the picture was stored in a house in the neighborhood, San Victorino, from where it was recovered.

In July 2026, president-elect Abelardo de la Espriella announced that he would move the presidential office back to the San Carlos Palace and turn the Casa de Nariño into a museum, but reversed course the following month after he had taken office, with authorities citing security concerns.

== Urban context ==
The Casa de Nariño is located on Seventh Street (Calle Séptima) between Seventh Avenue (Av. Carrera Séptima) and Eighth Road (Carrera Octava), in the historical sector of La Candelaria. The south side of the house connects to the church of San Agustin and the Ministry of Finance building as well as the statue of Antonio José de Sucre.

Seventh Street was made following the original riverbed direction of the San Agustin River that used to pass behind the Casa de Nariño. The riverbed was altered in 1909 and covered by Calle Séptima in 1979. With the expansion of the street the Sucre monument had to be relocated to the Ayacucho Square on the east side of the Casa de Nariño.

On the eastern side of Seventh Road is the Casa Republicana (Spanish for Republican House), the former Imperial Hotel, Ayacucho Square and The Presidential Administrative Building. On the west side of Eighth Street (Carrera Octava) is the Claustro de San Agustin and the Vice presidency building, both of them were built on the places where Camilo Torres’ house and the Office of the Botanical Expedition used to be.

On the north side of the Casa de Nariño, and in front of the neoclassical "pórtico", is the Plaza de Armas (Weapons Square), Antonio Nariño's statue and the Patio de Rafael Nuñez, which faces the National Capitol directly, and was built between 1847 and 1926.

== Description ==
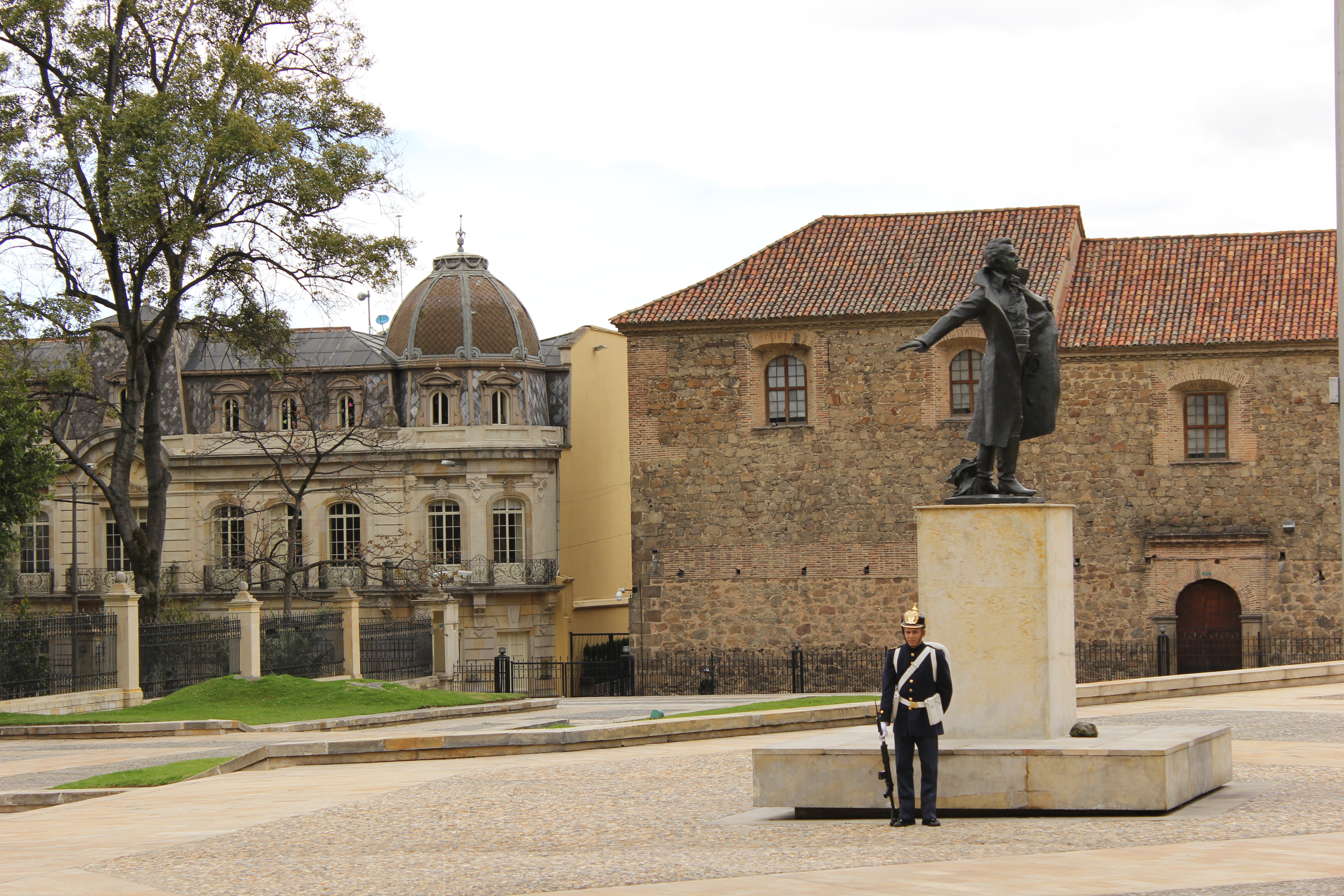
Antonio Nariño's statue Casa de Nariño

On the north side of the palace, is the Plaza de Armas (Parade Square), a place where foreign guests are received with military honors. On the north side of this square are two sculptures: A replica of the pre-Columbian anthropomorphic stone sculpture called "El dios de la muerte" (Spanish for the God of Death), whose original can be found in the San Agustin Archaeological Park, and also, a sculpture by Édgar Negret in 1979 titled "Vigilantes", it is composed of 10 red bent aluminum plates and is dedicated to love and feelings. On the west side of the square are the fountain and the flagpole.

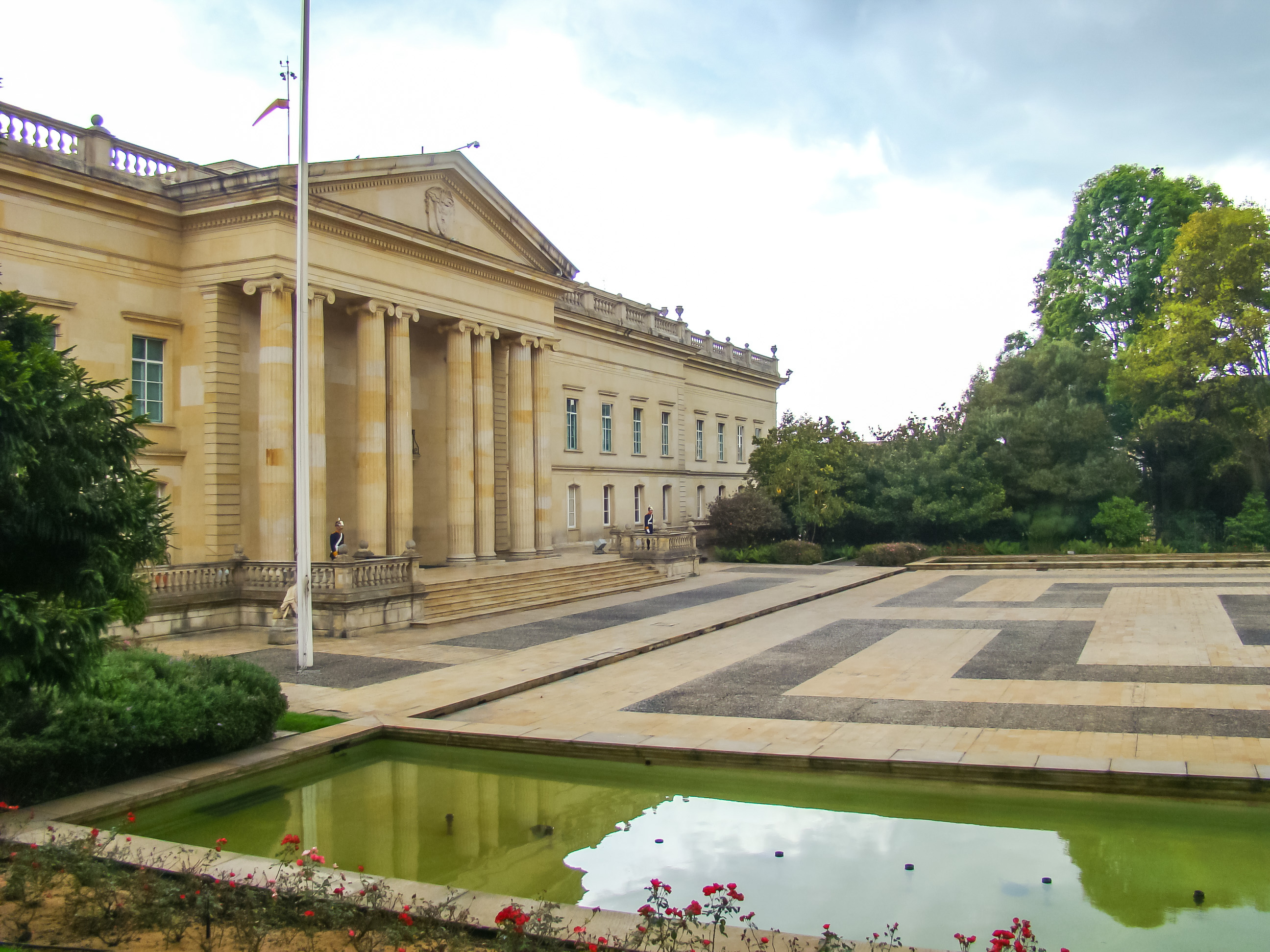
Casa de Nariño parade square.

On the west side of the Plaza de Armas is the National Observatory designed and built by the Capuchin architect Friar Domingo de Petrès between March 24, 1802, and August 20, 1803, and whose first director was José Celestino Mutis. The Observatory is the oldest in America and there the leaders of the first conspiracy movements reunited to plan the revolution of July 20, the first step to Colombian independence. Currently, the observatory is part of the National University.

On the Plaza de Armas the traditional Changing of Guard is carried out every day by the 37th Infantry Battalion. This military parade is one of the most famous acts performed on the Plaza de Armas, because the whole battalion reunites to do it. In front of the Plaza de Armas and the Patio de Rafael Nuñez, is a statue of Antonio Nariño by the French sculptor Henri-Léon Gréber made in 1910 and was relocated on July 19, 1980.

=== First Floor ===
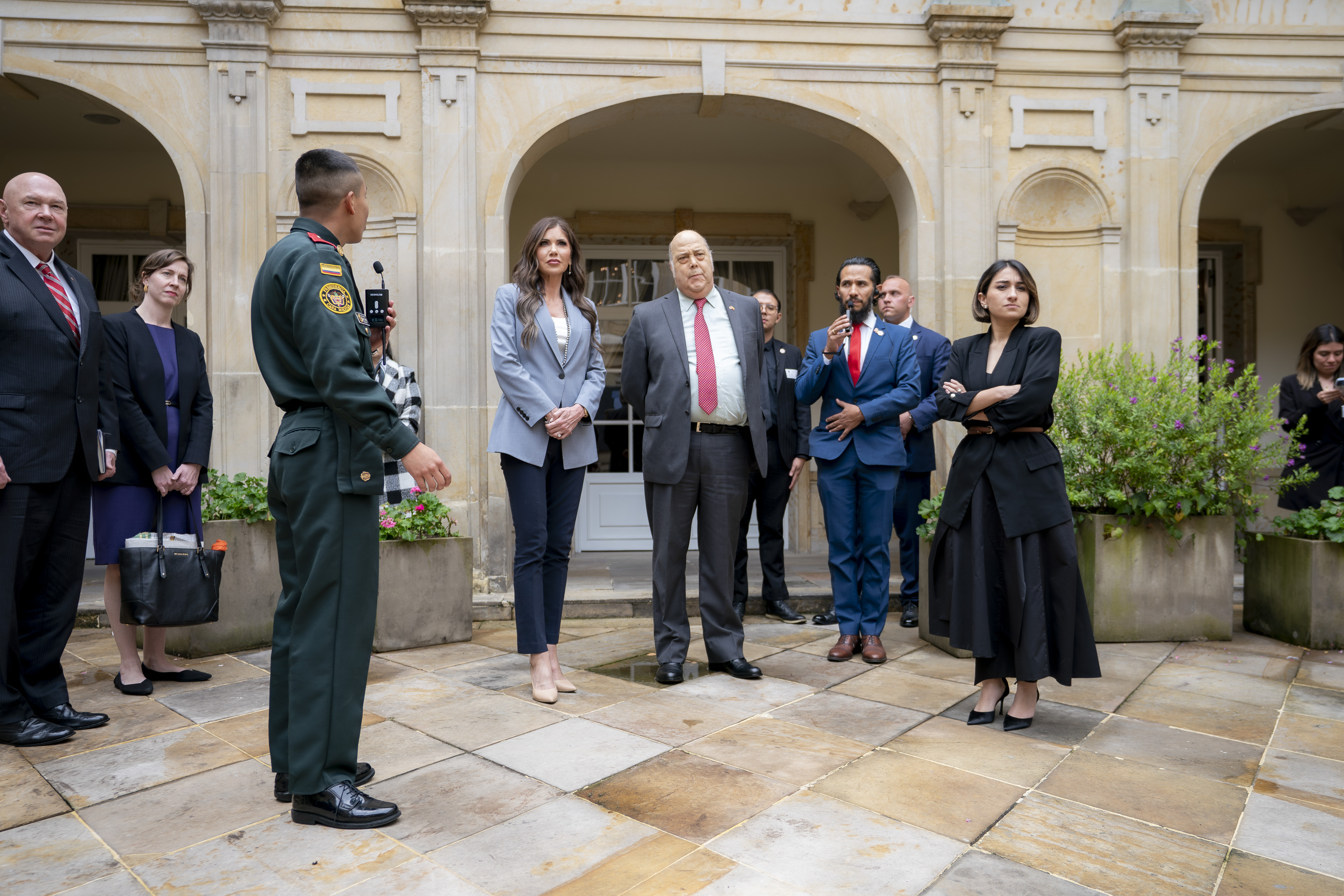
U.S. Homeland Security Secretary Kristi Noem, Foreign Minister Laura Sarabia, and Colombian Ambassador to the United States Daniel García-Peña at the Patio de los Novios.

In the main entrance is the Pasillo de las Banderas (Hall of flags), where the flags of the Military Forces of Colombia are located as follows: the flags of the Colombian Air Force, Colombian Navy, Colombian National Police and the flag of the central command in the center. In front of the military flags are the flags of Cartagena, Cundinamarca, Spain, the one created by Francisco de Miranda for the United Provinces of New Granada and the flag of July 20 (currently the flag of Bogotá).

After the hall of flags there is another room called the Bargueños Room or the Baules Room (Hall of trunks), that serves as a waiting room for visitors. The trunks of this room were the property of Simón Bolívar, and in which he used to carry the most important documents of war. There is also a large painting of Jesus by Gregorio Vasquez de Arce y Ceballos.

Another interesting part of the palace is the Salon Luis XV (Louis XV room) or Salon Carlos Holguin, so called from the oil painting of the former president Carlos Holguin. There is also another oil painting of the former president, General Rafael Reyes. The furniture of the room is in the Louis XV style; there is a lamp in the ceiling that is made of Murano glass with bronze incrustations.

Outside the doors of the Luis XV Salon is the Patio de los Novios (Suitors' Court), this place is where the carriages used to enter in the original construction, in the center of the patio there is a fountain and also a sculpture called Anudamiento (Knotting) by Edgar Negret. Behind the patio there is a gallery that has the portraits of the last 25 presidents; the one of Simon Bolivar is the only one that remains there when a portrait is removed after a new one arrives. At the bottom of this gallery there is a conference room which is the place where press conferences take place and the presidential speeches are broadcast. The first floor is complemented by the entrance from the Seventh Road where is placed a Roman sculpture of the god Silvanus, made in the 2nd century and was donated by Italy in 1956. In front of the entrance there is the Staircase of Honour that leads to the second floor and has two small sculptures in its base inspired by the Moorish warriors Othello and Lemir. Both the staircase and the room are part of the original construction.

=== Second Floor ===
Upstairs there is an anteroom where there is a picture, painted by Tito Salas, representing Bolivar's speech during the installation of the Congress of Angostura. There is also a German Piano that belonged to Manuelita Sáenz, two marble busts representing Simón Bolívar and Francisco de Paula Santander both made by Pietro Tenerani and a picture of Our Lady of Mount Carmel. In front of the stairs is the Salón Amarillo (Yellow Room) where the foreign ambassadors present their credentials to the president. The Yellow Room still has its original floor made out of bamboo and was decorated by Luigi Ramelli. In the Salon de los Gobelinos (Gobelinos room) there are several tapestries made in France in the workshop of the Gobelin Brothers.

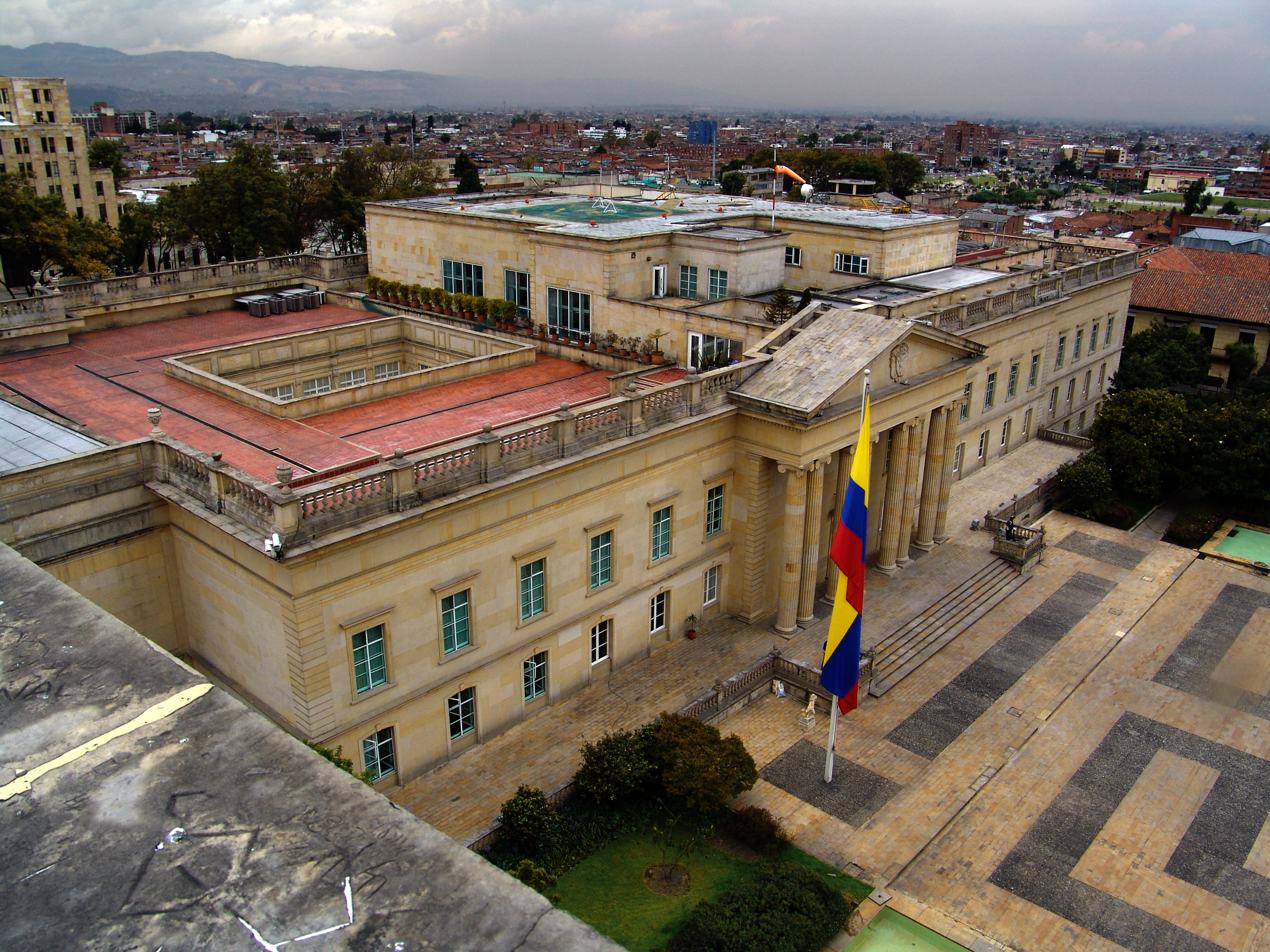
North side of the Casa de Nariño.

The Council of Ministers Room (El Salón de Consejo de Ministros) is the place where the president meets with his/her ministers and is decorated with the picture El Cóndor by Alejandro Obregón and the portraits of Camilo Torres, Jorge Tadeo Lozano, Domingo Caycedo and Joaquín Mosquera. There is also a picture called La constituyente made by Beatriz González. The anteroom of the formal room is decorated with the pictures Madre Superiora or La Monja (The nun) by Fernando Botero, the triptych Glorificación de Bolívar by Andrés de Santa María and Angela Cayendo by Alejandro Obregón. Inside the Formal Room (Salón Protocolario) some events such as the inauguration of public functionaries or the reception of illustrious people take place; this room is decorated with a Colombian Flag made out of rustic wool, horsehair and cotton. The President's private office is decorated with the portraits of Simón Bolívar, Francisco de Paula Santander and Antonio Nariño.

The main dining room of the Casa de Nariño is known as the Salón Azul (Blue room) or Salón Patria (Patriotic Room). It is decorated with enormous landscapes from different regions of Colombia, painted by Antonio Barrera, and vases gifted by the Government of China. Behind this room is the Salón Virreinal (Viceregal Room), which is decorated with the portrait of the Spanish viceroy Sebastián de Eslava who defended Cartagena de Indias against the English invasion. The vase inside the Salon Virreinal has a small beetle in its base and is a unique piece made in the Meissen workshop of Germany. The chapel located inside this room was built by order of Lorencita Villegas and it was used by Pope John Paul II during his visit to Colombia in 1986.

The Salón Bolivar (Bolívar Room) or Red Room is a space designed for special meetings and celebrations. In this room there is an oil painting of Simón Bolívar known as Bolívar Viviente by Ricardo Acevedo Bernal. The Emerald Room is decorated in Empire style, the highlights of which are the convex mirrors and the 19th century clock that still works.

== Security ==
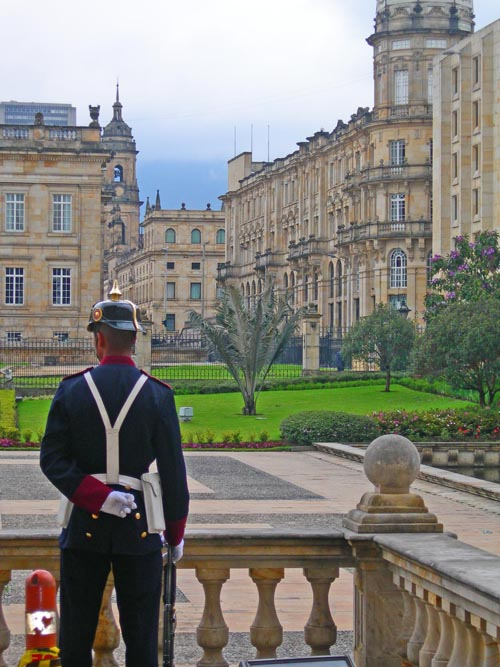
Presidential guard soldier.

The Casa de Nariño is guarded by the National Army of Colombia's 37th Infantry Presidential Guard Battalion also known as the Presidential Guard Battalion, created by the decree of the President of Colombia Miguel Abadía Méndez on September 7, 1927. Decree 367 of 1928 gave it its current name. The Battalion was raised by Lieutenant Colonel Roberto Perea Sanclemente on August 16, 1928. A precedent for its foundation is the so-called Guardia de Honor del libertador Simón Bolívar (Spanish for Honor Guard of the Liberator Simón Bolívar), created in 1814 on his orders during the Spanish American Wars of Independence.

The battalion is part of the Army's 5th Division (13th Infantry Brigade), and is composed of 1,400 people: 29 officers, 116 NCOs, 1,189 soldiers and 66 civilian personnel, it is subdivided into several companies: Córdova Company (Infantry), Rondon Troop (Cavalry), also known as "Los ponis de la Rondón" (Spanish for the Rondon ponies), Ricaurte Battery (Artillery), Caldas Company (Engineers) (named after Francisco José de Caldas), Wafersson or Fergusson Company and finally the soldiers' squad of the Military Household wearing historical uniforms. It also has its own military band and Corps of Drums. Its quarters are located in front of the Ministry of Finance's building, on the south side of the palace. Their slogan is "En Defensa del Honor Hasta la Muerte" ("In defense of honor till death"). Memorable actions of this battalion are remembered such as the protection given during the violent acts of the Bogotazo (April 9, 1948) and during the Palace of Justice Siege (November 6, 1985).

Resolution 3446 of August 17, 1955, created the medallion "Guardia Presidencial" and Decree 1880 of 1988 ruled the award merits for this prize given to the distinguished members of the battalion for their loyalty, service and good behavior.

On select weekdays and weekends the public can see the flag lowering and Guard Mounting ceremony in the afternoon by personnel of the battalion. It also has occasional public relations deployments to various towns and cities nationwide.

== See also ==
- Official residence
