= Palacio Liévano =

City hall of Bogotá, Colombia

Coordinates: 4.598415°N 74.076538°W

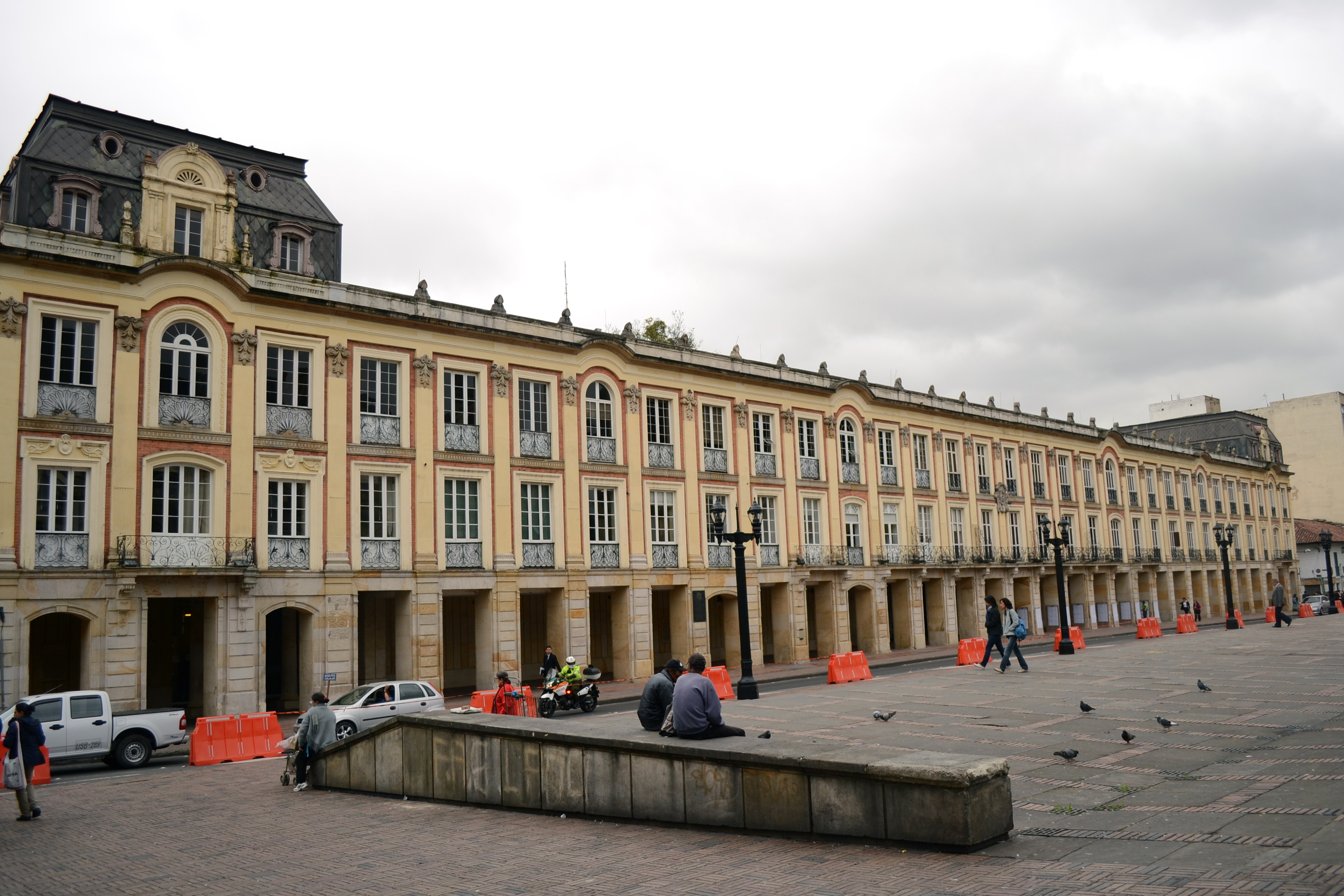
Palacio Liévano, Bogotá

The Palacio Liévano or Lievano Palace is a building located on the west side of the Plaza de Bolívar in Bogotá, Colombia in the cultural and historical hub of the city. The palace is located in La Candelaria district. Along the cobblestone streets of La Candelaria are other formal buildings such as the Plaza de Bolívar, the Palacio de Justicia, and the Casa de Nariño, as well as a library and museums.

The palace was converted into Bogotá's city hall in 1974.

== History ==
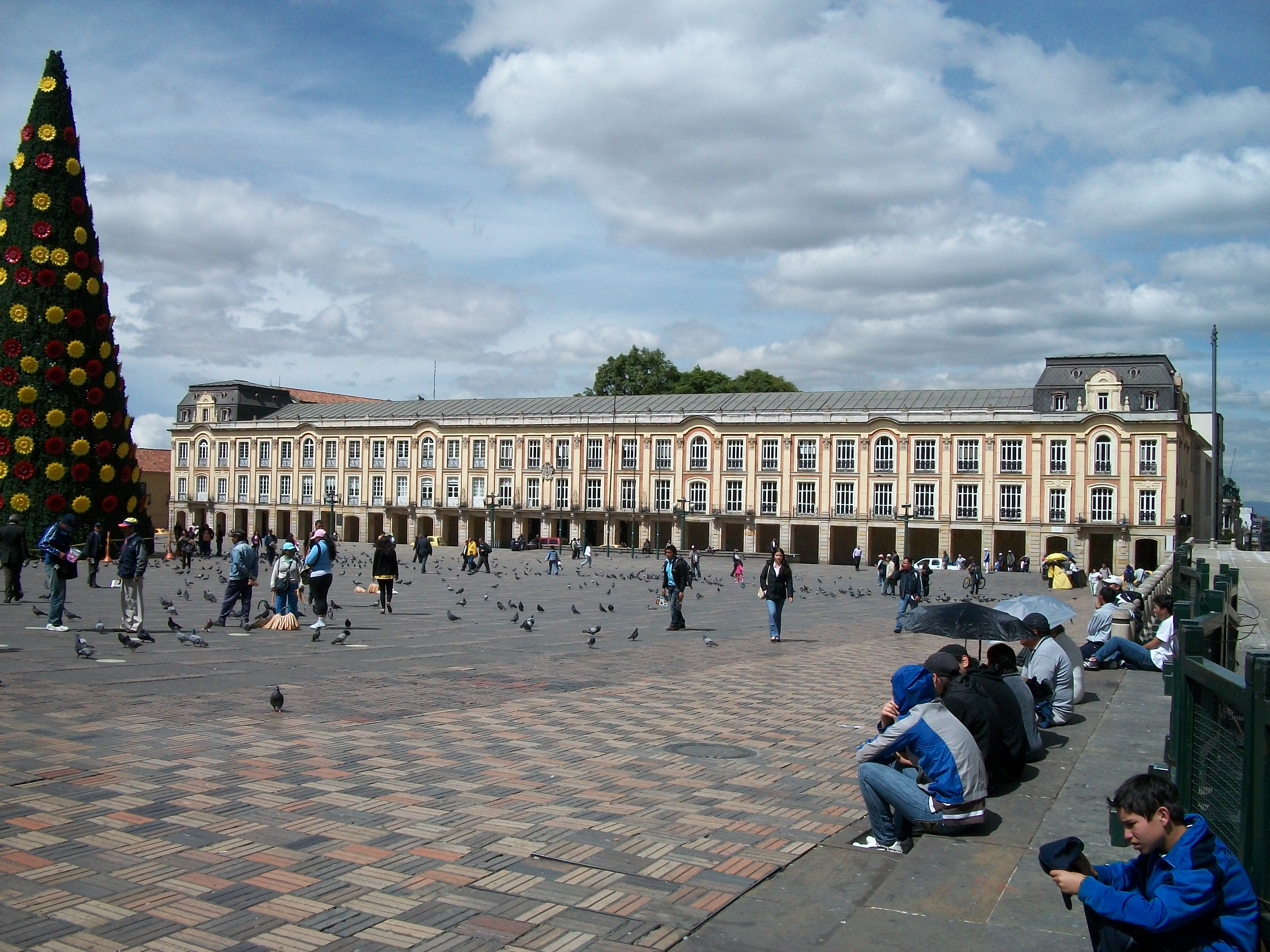
Eastern side of the Liévano palace.

The site where the Liévano now stands originally featured a number of administrative buildings, and the residence of Sanz de Santamaria and the Viceroys till 1810. Seriously damaged by the 1827-28 earthquakes, they were demolished and, in 1848, were replaced by a building known as the Galerías Arrubla, built by Juan Manuel Arrubla between 1843 and 1848. Bogotá's largest building at the time with a façade 53 m (174 ft) long, it was the centre of the city's business interests as well as the seat of the municipal administration.

After the building was completely destroyed by fire in 1900, one of its owners, the engineer Indalecio Liévano, managed to persuade the other owners that the French architect Gastón Lelarge (1861–1934) should be invited to draw up plans for a new building. In 1903, in agreement with the city authorities, a contract was concluded for the construction of a new building designed by Lelarge. Under the supervision of the architect Ricardo Lieras Codazzi the building was completed in 1907 at the same location where the galleries had been gutted earlier in 1900. Liévano built it with his own funds. Lelarge's design respected the proportions of the old Arrubla building but adopted a Neoclassical idiom which was new to the capital. However, the city administration acquired all the ownership rights of the palace in 1960.

After it had finally been decided the building should become the city hall, it was adapted to the purpose in 1974 by Fernando Martinez Sanabria under the architect Fernando Martinez but without the Mansard roof. The arcaded façade was nevertheless maintained but the shops and businesses which had once bordered the square had now gone.

== Architecture ==
Completed in the Neoclassical style (French Renaissance, as some describe it), the building is rectangular, three storeys high and flanked by large sections with Mansard roofs at either end. The façade consists of 32 windowed bays on each of its floors, decorated with balconies, columns, pilasters and capitals. Iron is used for ornamental detailing. There is an internal patio to the south with a bust of the independence hero José Acevedo y Gómez. The mayor's office on the first floor is a large room divided into a waiting room, the actual office and a lounge. The second floor is the most luxurious of all with its high-ceilinged sitting room known as the Gonzalo Jiménez de Quesada. Decorated with plaster reliefs and furnished with plush red curtains and chairs, it was here Bogotá's most illustrious citizens met to take key decisions. There is also a columned (of rectangular columns) arched portico at the ground level which runs along the front of the building and which serves the purpose of only providing shade and protection against rains. In the courtyard of the palace, the bust of José Acevedo y Gómez, a national hero, has been installed. The 450th anniversary of the city was marked by affixing 24 plaques in the walls of the palace on the first floor, recording the history of the city.
