= Palmar, Santander =

Coordinates: 6°35′N 73°15′W

- Municipality and town
- Location of the municipality and town of Palmar, Santander in the Santander Department of Colombia.
- Country: Colombia
- Department: Santander Department
- Time zone: UTC-5 (Colombia Standard Time)

Palmar is a town and municipality in the Santander Department in northeastern Colombia.

== Climate ==
Cimitarra has a tropical rainforest climate (Köppen: Af), bordering upon a tropical monsoon climate (Am). It is wet from March to November and has a drier period from December to February.

Climate data for Palmar (Palmar El), elevation 940 m (3,080 ft), (1981–2010)
Month	Jan	Feb	Mar	Apr	May	Jun	Jul	Aug	Sep	Oct	Nov	Dec	Year
Mean daily maximum °C (°F)	32.4 (90.3)	32.9 (91.2)	32.6 (90.7)	31.9 (89.4)	31.1 (88.0)	31.0 (87.8)	31.6 (88.9)	32.1 (89.8)	31.5 (88.7)	30.5 (86.9)	30.2 (86.4)	31.1 (88.0)	31.6 (88.9)
Daily mean °C (°F)	26.4 (79.5)	26.5 (79.7)	26.5 (79.7)	26.1 (79.0)	25.7 (78.3)	25.7 (78.3)	25.7 (78.3)	25.8 (78.4)	25.6 (78.1)	25.2 (77.4)	25.4 (77.7)	25.8 (78.4)	25.9 (78.6)
Mean daily minimum °C (°F)	19.7 (67.5)	19.9 (67.8)	20.5 (68.9)	20.4 (68.7)	20.4 (68.7)	20.1 (68.2)	19.6 (67.3)	19.7 (67.5)	19.6 (67.3)	19.7 (67.5)	20.0 (68.0)	19.9 (67.8)	20.0 (68.0)
Average rainfall mm (inches)	64.4 (2.54)	84.5 (3.33)	124.2 (4.89)	217.5 (8.56)	216.6 (8.53)	126.9 (5.00)	133.9 (5.27)	149.2 (5.87)	203.6 (8.02)	262.8 (10.35)	189.6 (7.46)	75.2 (2.96)	1,848.5 (72.78)
Average rainy days	7	9	12	17	20	17	18	19	19	20	16	9	178
Average relative humidity (%)	69	68	69	72	75	75	73	73	74	76	76	73	73
Source: Instituto de Hidrologia Meteorologia y Estudios Ambientales
