= Martín Galeano =

Spanish conquistador

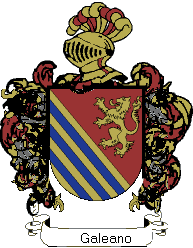
- Coat of arms of the Galeano family
- Born: Genoa or Valencia del Mombuey, Badajoz, Castile
- Died: Vélez, New Kingdom of Granada
- Occupations: Conquistador
- Years active: 1536-?
- Employer: Spanish Crown
- Known for: Spanish conquest of the Muisca; Spanish conquest of the Guane; Founder of Vélez, Oiba & Charalá
- Spouses: Unnamed; Isabel Juan de Meteller
- Children: 1

Martín Galeano was a Spanish conquistador of Genovese descent who is known as the founder of the towns of Vélez, Oiba and Charalá in Santander, Colombia. He took part in the expedition of the Spanish conquest of the Muisca led by Gonzalo Jiménez de Quesada. After the foundation of Bogotá, he was sent northwards into Guane territories.

== Biography ==
Martín Galeano was born in Valencia del Mombuey, Badajoz or Genoa and had one brother, Pedro Galeano, and one sister, Ángela Jiménez Galeano. He married twice: with an unnamed woman; and with Isabel Juan de Meteller, formerly married to Pedro Ortuño Royo. With the unnamed woman, Galeano had one daughter; Marina, or Martina, Galeano, who became an encomendera.

== Conquest by Martín Galeano ==
Name bold is founded	Department	Date	Year	Notes	Map
Vélez	Santander	2 July or14 September	1539		
Oiba	Santander	28 February	1540		
Charalá	Santander	23 July	1540		
Simacota	Santander		1551		

== Gallery ==
Coat of arms of Vélez, Santander

== See also ==
- List of conquistadors in Colombia
- Spanish conquest of the Muisca
- El Dorado
- Spanish conquest of the Guane, Hernán Pérez de Quesada
- Gonzalo Jiménez de Quesada, Guane, Vélez

== Bibliography ==
- Rodríguez Freyle, Juan; Achury Valenzuela, Darío (1979) [1859 (1638)], El Carnero - Conquista i descubrimiento del nuevo reino de Granada de las Indias Occidentales del mar oceano, i fundacion de la ciudad de Santa Fe de Bogota (PDF) (in Spanish), Fundacion Biblioteca Ayacuch, pp. 1–598
