= Los Santos, Santander =

Coordinates: 6°55′N 73°05′W

Los Santos
- Municipality and town
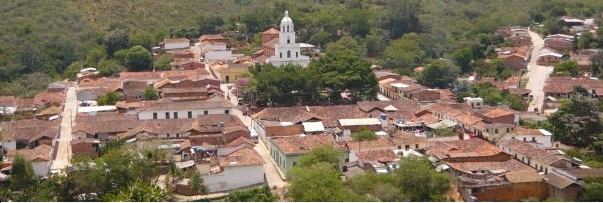

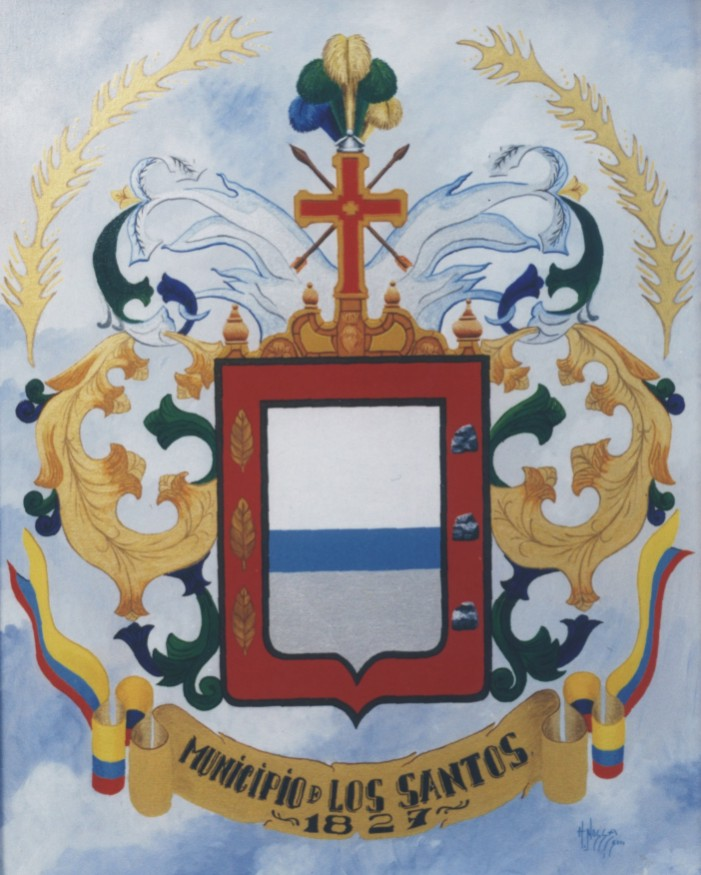
- Flag Coat of arms

- Location of the municipality and town of Los Santos in the Santander Department of Colombia.
- Country: Colombia
- Department: Santander Department

Area
  - Total: 302 km^{2} (117 sq mi)

Population (Census 2018)
  - Total: 12,433
  - Density: 41.2/km^{2} (107/sq mi)
- Time zone: UTC-5 (Colombia Standard Time)

Los Santos is a town and municipality in the Santander Department in northeastern Colombia.
