= Vélez, Santander =

Coordinates: 6°00.62′N 73°40.579999′W

- Municipality and town
- Vélez in 2019

- Flag Coat of arms

- Location of the municipality and town of Vélez, Santander in the Santander Department of Colombia.
- Country: Colombia
- Department: Santander Department
- Founded: September 14, 1539
- Founder: Martín Galeano

Area
  - Total: 250 km^{2} (97 sq mi)

Population (Census 2018)
  - Total: 19,376
  - Density: 78/km^{2} (200/sq mi)
- Demonym: Veleño -a
- Time zone: UTC-5 (Colombia Standard Time)
- Website: www.velez-santander.gov.co

Vélez (Spanish pronunciation: [ˈbeles]) is a town and municipality of the Santander Department in northeastern Colombia.

== Climate ==
Climate data for Vélez (Velez Granja), elevation 2,170 m (7,120 ft), (1981–2010)
Month	Jan	Feb	Mar	Apr	May	Jun	Jul	Aug	Sep	Oct	Nov	Dec	Year
Mean daily maximum °C (°F)	23.4 (74.1)	23.5 (74.3)	23.3 (73.9)	23.1 (73.6)	22.9 (73.2)	22.9 (73.2)	22.7 (72.9)	22.7 (72.9)	22.9 (73.2)	22.6 (72.7)	22.6 (72.7)	22.9 (73.2)	22.9 (73.2)
Daily mean °C (°F)	16.7 (62.1)	16.7 (62.1)	16.7 (62.1)	16.7 (62.1)	16.7 (62.1)	16.7 (62.1)	16.6 (61.9)	16.6 (61.9)	16.6 (61.9)	16.4 (61.5)	16.4 (61.5)	16.7 (62.1)	16.6 (61.9)
Mean daily minimum °C (°F)	11.9 (53.4)	12.0 (53.6)	12.2 (54.0)	12.4 (54.3)	12.5 (54.5)	12.3 (54.1)	12.0 (53.6)	12.0 (53.6)	12.0 (53.6)	12.0 (53.6)	12.1 (53.8)	12.0 (53.6)	12.1 (53.8)
Average precipitation mm (inches)	55.4 (2.18)	79.2 (3.12)	135.5 (5.33)	244.0 (9.61)	273.1 (10.75)	186.1 (7.33)	171.4 (6.75)	170.9 (6.73)	222.8 (8.77)	263.7 (10.38)	185.6 (7.31)	86.1 (3.39)	2,067.2 (81.39)
Average precipitation days	10	12	17	22	24	20	21	20	21	24	20	13	225
Average relative humidity (%)	87	86	87	89	89	88	87	87	87	89	90	89	88
Mean monthly sunshine hours	207.7	172.2	151.9	120.0	130.2	144.0	164.3	167.4	150.0	133.3	144.0	192.2	1,877.2
Mean daily sunshine hours	6.7	6.1	4.9	4.0	4.2	4.8	5.3	5.4	5.0	4.3	4.8	6.2	5.1
Source: Instituto de Hidrologia Meteorologia y Estudios Ambientales

== Notable people ==
- Eduard Atuesta (born 1997) – footballer who represented the Colombia national team
