= Páramo, Santander =

Coordinates: 6°30′N 73°08′W

- Municipality and town
- Flag

- Location of the municipality and town of Paramo, Santander in the Santander Department of Colombia.
- Country: Colombia
- Department: Santander Department
- Time zone: UTC-5 (Colombia Standard Time)

Páramo is a town and municipality in the Santander Department in northeastern Colombia.
