= Guapotá =

Coordinates: 6°23′N 73°15′W

- Municipality and town
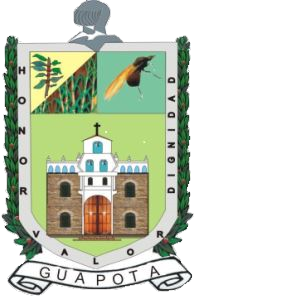
- Flag Coat of arms

- Location of the municipality and town of Guapotá in the Santander Department of Colombia
- Country: Colombia
- Department: Santander Department
- Time zone: UTC-5 (Colombia Standard Time)

Guapotá is a town and municipality in the Santander Department on northeastern Colombia.
