= Ocamonte =

Coordinates: 6°20′N 73°07′W

- Municipality and town
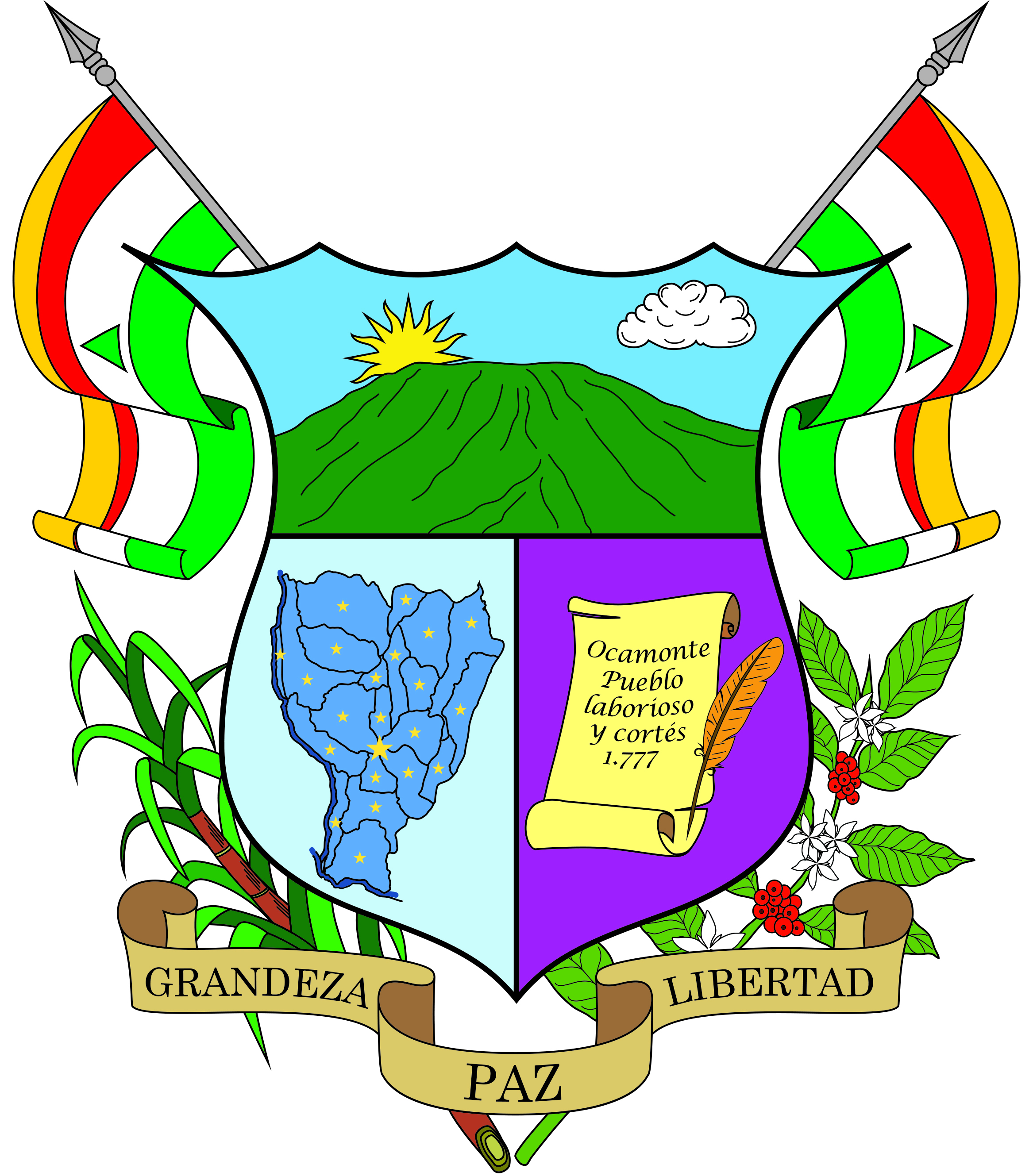
- Flag Seal Coat of arms

- Location of the municipality and town of Ocamonte in the Santander Department of Colombia.
- Country: Colombia
- Department: Santander Department

Area
  - Total: 84 km^{2} (32 sq mi)
- Elevation: 746 m (2,448 ft)
- Time zone: UTC-5 (Colombia Standard Time)

Ocamonte is a town and municipality in the Santander Department in northeastern Colombia.

== Location ==
The municipality is located just one hour away from San Gil by paved road. There are three access routes: San Gil-Ocamonte by the bridge "palenque" Charalá - Ocamonte unpaved road as Valle de San José - Ocamonte.

== Tourism ==
Because of its proximity to San Gil (Capital Tourism), Ocamonte has become a good destination. It offers a walk in the cerro de La Soap (2200 m), where a monument can be seen approximately 15 yards to the Virgin Mary. This place, besides being a religious destination, offers a spectacular panoramic view as it is the highest mountain in the area, allowing municipalities to observe Ocamonte, Charalá and Paramo, its rural areas, as well as Russia and Westfall Sugar Loaf.

== Geography ==
Ocamonte bordered to the north San Jose Valley, south and west to east with Charalá and Coromoro. In the town highlights the beauty of the hill of the Soap, a mountain that starts just off the town, which is at 1408 meters. The climate varies a bit due to height differences ranging from 1300 to the 2300 meters.

The antipode of Ocamonte is located within the Indonesian capital Jakarta.

== Economy ==
Ocamontanas lands are characterized by fertile soil which allows the growth of a wide variety of crops, among which include coffee, sugar cane and corn.
