= Coromoro =

Coordinates: 6°18′N 73°02′W

- Municipality and town
- Flag Coat of arms

- Location of the municipality and town of Coromoro in the Santander Department of Colombia
- Country: Colombia
- Department: Santander Department
- Elevation: 1,518 m (4,980 ft)
- Time zone: UTC-5 (Colombia Standard Time)

Coromoro is a town and municipality in the Santander Department in northeastern Colombia.
