= Juan del Junco =

Spanish conquistador

- Born: 1503; Oviedo, Asturias
- Died: Unknown; Santo Domingo, Hispaniola
- Other name: Juan de Junco
- Occupations: Conquistador
- Years active: 1526-1541
- Employer: Spanish Crown
- Known for: Spanish conquest of the Muisca
- Spouse: Inés de Villalobos
- Children: Yes, but names unknown

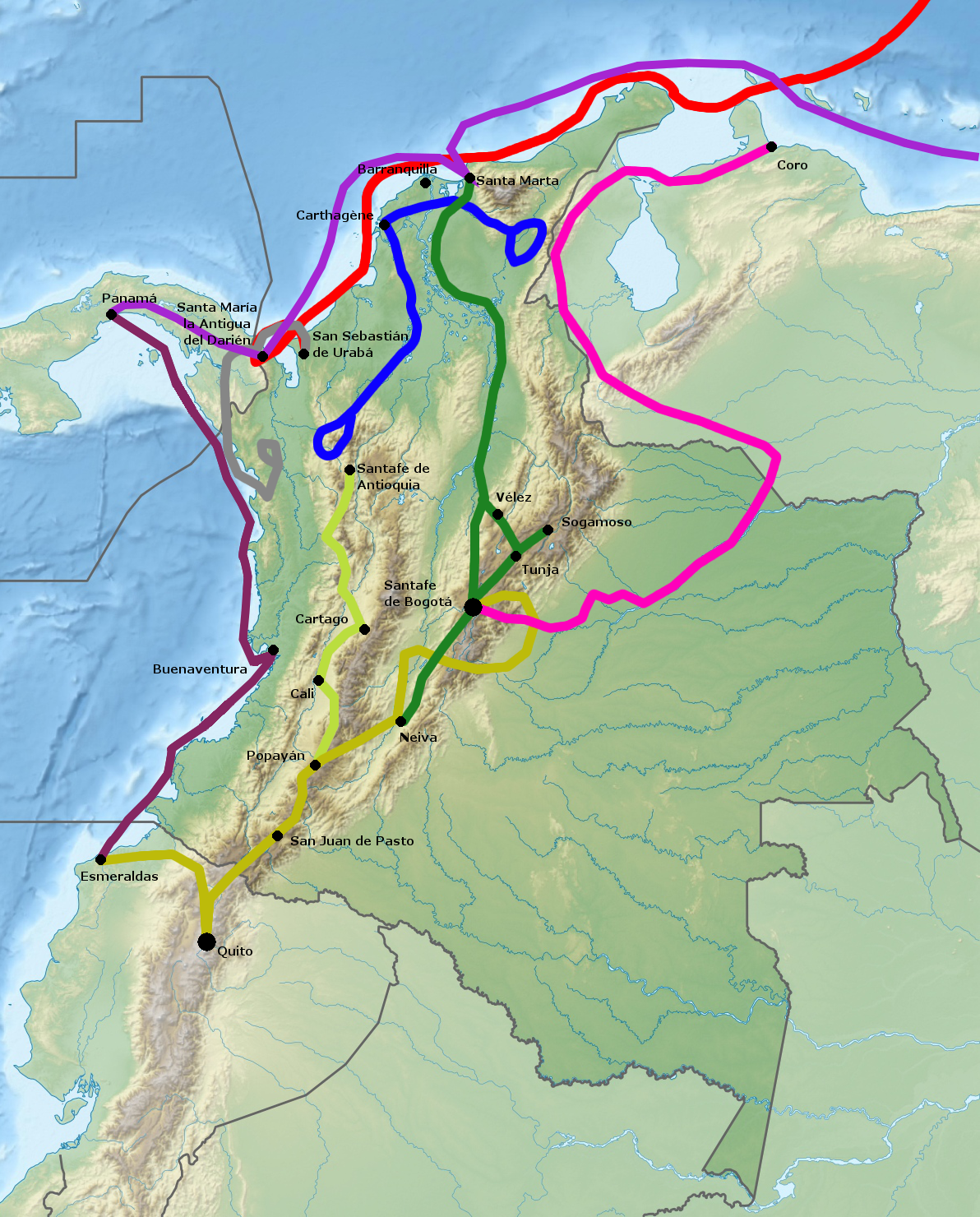
Juan del Junco was one of the captains in the expedition along the green route from Santa Marta into the Muisca Confederation

Juan de(l) Junco (1503 in Ribadesella, Asturias, Castile – ? in Santo Domingo) was a Spanish conquistador who participated in the Spanish conquest of the Muisca people. Del Junco started his career as a conquistador in the 1526 expedition led by Sebastian Cabot exploring the Río de la Plata in present-day Argentina. In 1535, he arrived in Santa Marta on the Colombian Caribbean coast from where the expedition in search of El Dorado set off in April 1536.

Del Junco played a role in the foundations of Bogotá (August 6, 1538), and Tunja (August 6, 1539). He was a senior captain under Gonzalo Jiménez de Quesada. Del Junco was named second in line of succession, after Gonzalo's brother Hernán, in the event of the death of the first governor of the New Kingdom of Granada. Del Junco was awarded the encomienda (mayoralty) of Cucaita, close to Tunja, for his efforts as a soldier. In 1541, Del Junco left South America for Santo Domingo, where he married and remained until his death.

Juan del Junco was named by several early chroniclers of the Spanish conquest of Colombia: Epítome de la conquista del Nuevo Reino de Granada (first published in 1889); Elegías de varones ilustres de Indias (De Castellanos, 1589); El Carnero (Freyle, 1638); and Historia general de las conquistas del Nuevo Reino de Granada (De Piedrahita, 1676).

== Biography ==
=== Early career ===
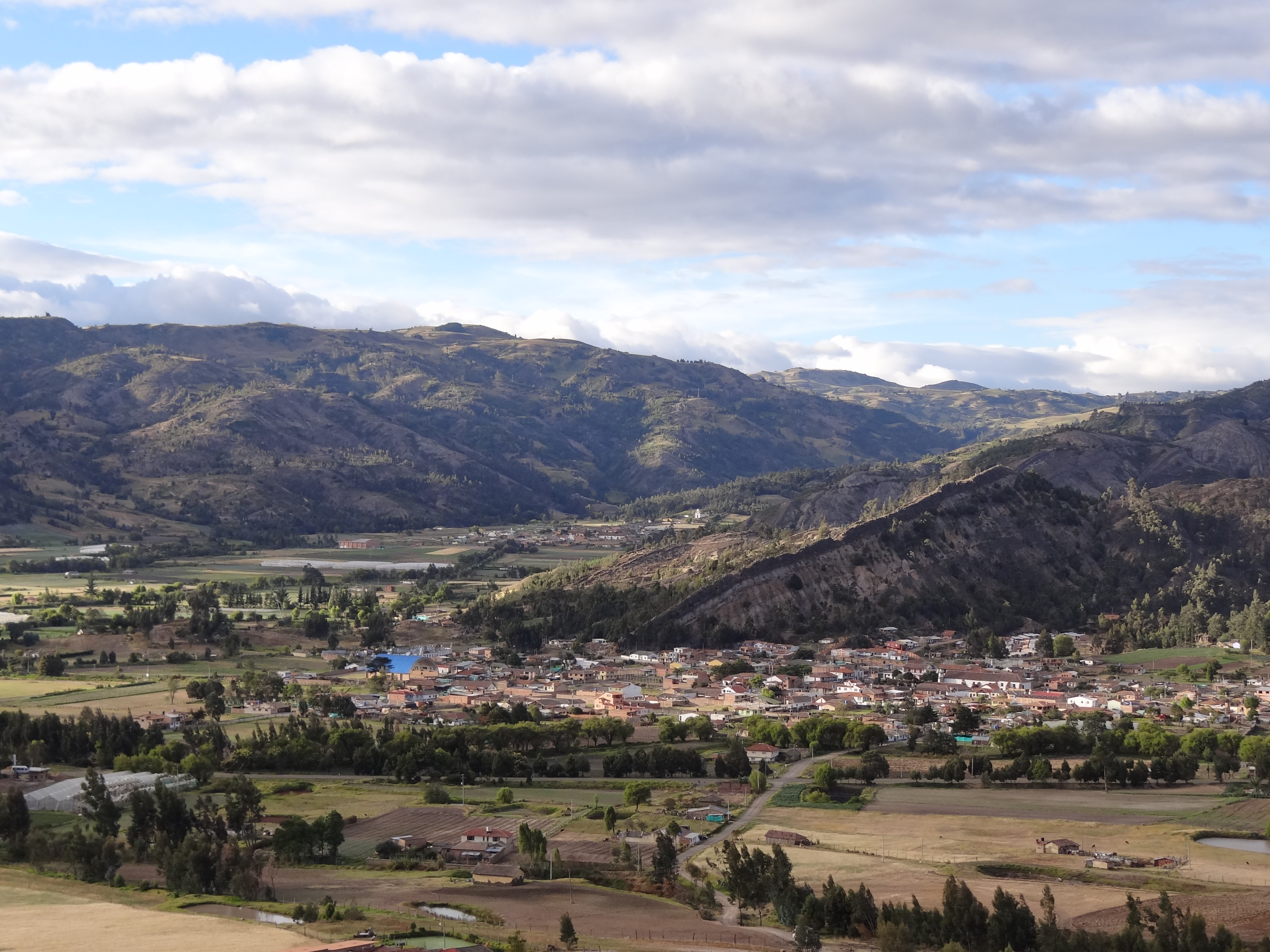
As a reward for his efforts Juan del Junco received the encomienda of Cucaita

Juan del Junco, in some texts also named as Juan de Junco, was born and baptized in Ribadesella, Asturias in 1503. He was active as a soldier in Hungary and Italy in his early years.

=== American Expeditions ===
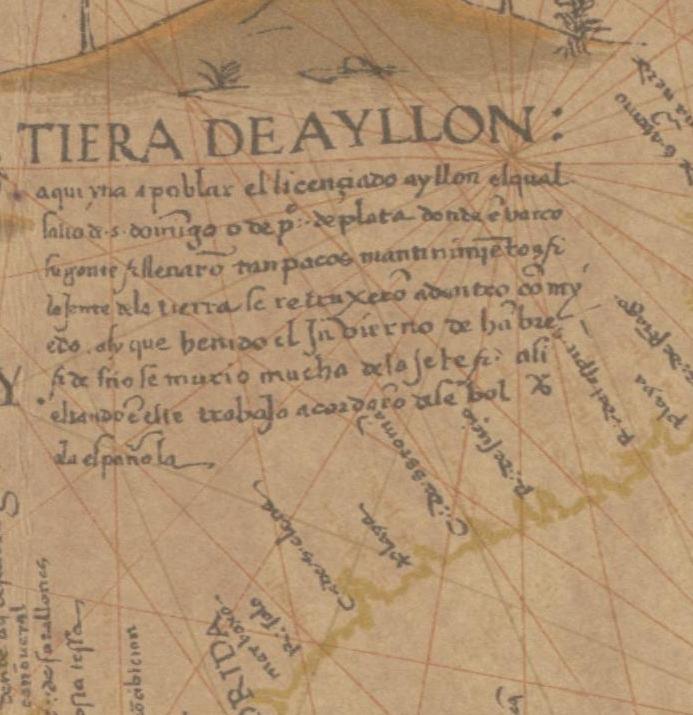
Del Junco's father-in-law, Lucas Vázquez de Ayllón, is known as the first founder of a European settlement on the American east coast. Map by Diego Ribero, 1539

The conquest expeditions of Juan del Junco commenced in 1526, when he embarked on a ship leaving Sanlúcar de Barrameda. He served under Sebastian Cabot in the exploration of the Río de la Plata. In 1532 or 1533, taking Hernán Venegas Carrillo with him, Del Junco sailed to Santo Domingo, Hispaniola. From there his plan was to travel to the newly founded city of Cartagena, but went to Santa Marta instead to assist Roberto Infante, then governor of the city, arriving in 1535.

Del Junco joined the harsh expedition into the Colombian Andes from Santa Marta as a captain in an expedition led by Gonzalo Jiménez de Quesada, departing on April 6, 1536. After almost one year, the heavily reduced regiment reached the Muisca Confederation on the Bogotá savanna. As a captain Del Junco participated in the foundation of Bogotá on August 6, 1538 by Gonzalo Jiménez de Quesada; and Tunja on August 6, 1539 by Gonzalo Suárez Rendón.

Juan del Junco is noted as one of the captains of the newly founded New Kingdom of Granada to hand back the weapons of the earlier dismissed Lázaro Fonte, lover of Zoratama. His companions in this task were Gonzalo Suárez Rendón, Pedro Fernández de Valenzuela and Diego Paredes. Fonte was imprisoned but released when he informed De Quesada of the arrival of two other conquest expeditions on the Altiplano Cundiboyacense, by Nikolaus Federmann from the east and Sebastián de Belalcázar from the south. Fonte had used the skin of a deer to write his revelations.

=== Local government ===
After the conquest expeditions, captain Del Junco was appointed a regidor (councillor) of Santa Fe de Bogotá, and received the encomienda of Cucaita, in the province of Tunja. He was the next in line to succeed as governor of the province in the event of the death of Hernán Pérez de Quesada, brother of Gonzalo Jiménez de Quesada. He spent twenty months in the New Kingdom of Granada and extorted 20,000 pesos of gold from the Muisca people. Notable caciques he pillaged gold and emeralds from were the caciques of Quiminza, Cucayta, Boyacá, Sora, Sutamanga and Cuqueitagacha. In a 1560 letter, Juan del Junco wrote to the Spanish Crown "of the 11,000 indians that resided on the banks of the Magdalena River, not even 500 survived".

=== Personal life ===
In 1541, Del Junco returned to Santo Domingo, the city he had left six years before. He married Inés de Villalobos, daughter of oidor (judge) Lucas Vázquez de Ayllón. The couple had children, but their fate is unknown, as is the year of his death.

== See also ==
- List of conquistadors in Colombia
- Spanish conquest of the Muisca
- Hernán Pérez de Quesada
- Gonzalo Suárez Rendón, Gonzalo Jiménez de Quesada

== Bibliography ==
- Acosta, Joaquín (1848), Compendio histórico del descubrimiento y colonización de la Nueva Granada en el siglo décimo sexto - Historical overview of discovery and colonization of New Granada in the sixteenth century (PDF), Paris: Beau Press, pp. 1–460, OCLC 23030434, archived from the original (PDF) on 2012-08-18
- De Castellanos, Juan (1857) [1589], Elegías de varones ilustres de Indias (in Spanish), Pontificia Universidad Javeriana, pp. 1–567, ISBN 978-958-683-677-7
- Fernández de Piedrahita, Lucas (1676), "VI", Historia general de las conquistas del Nuevo Reino de Granada (PDF) (in Spanish), archived from the original (PDF) on 2014-06-11
- Ocampo López, Javier (1996), Leyendas populares colombianas - Popular Colombian legends (in Spanish), Plaza y Janes Editores, pp. 1–384, ISBN 9789581402670
- De Plaza, José Antonio (1810), Memorias para la historia de la Nueva Granada desde su descubrimiento el 20 de julio de 1810, Imprenta del Neo-Granadino, pp. 1–464
- Rodríguez Freyle, Juan; Achury Valenzuela, Darío (1979) [1859 (1638)], El Carnero - Conquista i descubrimiento del nuevo reino de Granada de las Indias Occidentales del mar oceano, i fundacion de la ciudad de Santa Fe de Bogota (in Spanish), Fundacion Biblioteca Ayacuch, pp. 1–592, ISBN 978-84-660-0025-3
- Epítome de la conquista del Nuevo Reino de Granada, Banco de la República, 1979 [1889 (1539)], pp. 81–97
