= Gonzalo Macías =

Spanish conquistador

- Born: c.1509 Calamonte, Extremadura, Castile
- Died: unknown New Kingdom of Granada
- Occupation: Conquistador
- Years active: 1536-?
- Employer: Spanish Crown
- Known for: Spanish conquest of the Muisca; Quest for El Dorado
- Spouse: Juana Moreno de Figueroa
- Children: Leonor and Juana Macías de Figueroa

Gonzalo Macías (c. 1509, Calamonte, Extremadura, Castile – ?, Tunja, New Kingdom of Granada) was a Spanish conquistador who participated in the expedition from Santa Marta into the Muisca Confederation that was led by Gonzalo Jiménez de Quesada from 1536 to 1538. He settled in Tunja, formerly called Hunza, as seat of the zaque.

== Personal life ==
Gonzalo Macías was born around 1509 in the Extremaduran town of Calamonte. He married Juana Moreno de Figueroa, who was also from Calamonte, and the couple had two daughters, Leonor and Juana Macías de Figueroa. His daughter Leonor Macías de Figueroa married conquistador Pedro Luis de Sanabria, who was active in the conquest of Venezuela under Jerónimo de Ortal, and also served under Sebastián de Belalcázar in Ecuador and southern Colombia. Juana married Francisco Salguero with whom she founded the Santa Clara Monastery in Tunja in 1573, the first clarissan monastery for nuns in the Americas.

== See also ==
- List of conquistadors in Colombia
- Spanish conquest of the Muisca
- El Dorado
- Tunja, Hernán Pérez de Quesada
- Gonzalo Jiménez de Quesada, Gonzalo Suárez Rendón

== Bibliography ==
- Rodríguez Freyle, Juan; Achury Valenzuela, Darío (1979) [1859 (1638)], El Carnero - Conquista i descubrimiento del nuevo reino de Granada de las Indias Occidentales del mar oceano, i fundacion de la ciudad de Santa Fe de Bogota (PDF) (in Spanish), Fundacion Biblioteca Ayacuch, pp. 1–598
