= Ortún Velázquez de Velasco =

Spanish conquistador

- Born: c. 1500; Cuéllar,Castile
- Died: 4 November 1584; Pamplona, Pamplona Province, New Kingdom of Granada
- Occupations: Conquistador
- Years active: 1536–1584
- Employer: Spanish Crown
- Known for: Spanish conquest of the Muisca; Quest for El Dorado
- Spouse: Luisa Montalvo de Lugo
- Children: 1 son 2 daughters

Mayor of Tunja
- In office 1544–1544
- Preceded by: García Arias Maldonado & Hernando de Beteta
- Succeeded by: Hernando de Escalante & Sebastián de Almarcha

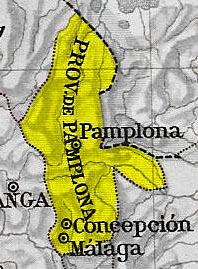
Map of the Pamplona Province

Ortún Velázquez de Velasco (c. 1500 – 4 November 1584) was a Spanish conquistador. He is known as the co-founder and first governor of Pamplona in the Norte de Santander department of Colombia, which borders Venezuela.

== American expeditions ==
Velázquez de Velasco took part in the expedition of the Spanish conquest of the Muisca people led by Gonzalo Jiménez de Quesada from 1536 to 1539. He then settled in Tunja under Gonzalo Suárez Rendón. He married there, was mayor of the city in 1544, and left in 1548. From 1549 he participated in the conquest of the Chitarero people and the foundation of Pamplona under Pedro de Ursúa.

== Personal life ==
Ortún Velázquez de Velasco was born around 1500 in the town of Cuéllar, Segovia Province, Castile and León, the only son of Gutierre Velázquez de Cuéllar, lord of Villavaquerín, and María Enríquez de Acuña. He had one sister, Ana Velázquez. Velázquez de Velasco married Luisa Montalvo de Lugo in Tunja in 1545 and the couple had three children: one son and two daughters. María Velázquez de Velasco y Montalvo married conquistador Juan Maldonado Ordóñez.

== See also ==
- List of conquistadors in Colombia
- Spanish conquest of the Muisca
- El Dorado
- Spanish conquest of the Chitarero
- Gonzalo Jiménez de Quesada, Gonzalo Suárez Rendón, Pamplona, Norte de Santander

== Bibliography ==
- Muñoz Cárdenas, Felipe Andrés (2014), La Administración de Tunja a través del siglo XX – The Administration of Tunja through the twentieth century (PDF), Universidad Nacional de Colombia, pp. 1–163, archived from the original (PDF) on 2017-03-09
- Rodríguez Freyle, Juan; Achury Valenzuela, Darío (1979) [1859 (1638)], El Carnero – Conquista i descubrimiento del nuevo reino de Granada de las Indias Occidentales del mar oceano, i fundacion de la ciudad de Santa Fe de Bogota (PDF) (in Spanish), Fundacion Biblioteca Ayacuch, pp. 1–598, archived from the original (PDF) on 2020-08-07
