= Juan Taborda =

Alcalde of Antioquia
- In office 1555–1556
- Monarch: Charles V

Personal details
- Born: 1515 Alburquerque, Badajoz, Spain
- Died: 1569 (aged 53–54) Medellín, New Kingdom of Granada
- Spouse: Leonor López de Santofimia
- Occupation: Conquistador
- Profession: Army officer

Military service
- Allegiance: Spanish Army
- Branch/service: Spain
- Rank: Captain

Juan Taborda (ca. 1505 – 1569) was an Extremaduran captain and conquistador, companion of Jorge Robledo, during the conquest of Antioquia. He served as regidor and mayor, being the founder of the surname Taborda in Colombia, extended through his descendants throughout the South American continent.

== Biography ==
Taborda was born in Alburquerque, Extremadura, around 1515 with only his father known as Alonso Taborda Díaz. He had a brother, Francisco, and a sister Catalina de Rivera. Taborda arrived in the New World around the year 1545.

Juan Taborda was married to Leonor López de Santofimia, daughter of Diego Lopez de Santofimia, a Spanish nobleman, who served as a notary public in the city of Antioquia. He and his wife were parents of Juana Taborda, Juan Taborda and Leonor Taborda. His son Juan Taborda ("el Mozo") was mayor in 1573, 1575, 1581 and regidor in 1574.

== See also ==
- List of conquistadors in Colombia
