= List of conquistadors in Colombia =

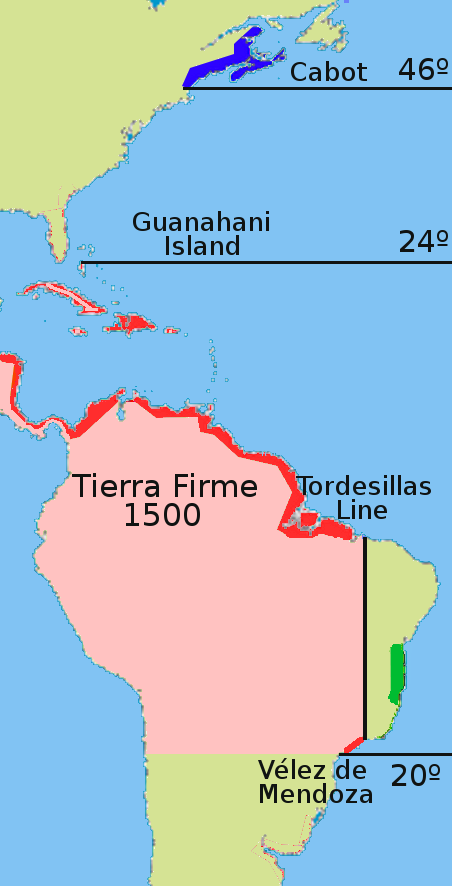
The Spanish Empire (1500)

This is a list of conquistadors who were active in the conquest of terrains that presently belong to Colombia. The nationalities listed refer to the state the conquistador was born into. Granada and Castile are currently part of Spain, but were separate states at the time of birth of the early conquistadors.

Important conquistadors and explorers were Alonso de Ojeda, who landed first at Colombian soil and founded the first settlement Santa Cruz, Rodrigo de Bastidas, who founded the oldest still remaining city Santa Marta, Pedro de Heredia, who founded the important city of Cartagena in 1533, Gonzalo Jiménez de Quesada, who was the leader of the first and main expedition into the Andes (1536–1538), with his brother second in command and many other conquistadors, 80% of whom who didn't survive, and Nikolaus Federmann and Sebastián de Belalcázar who entered the Colombian interior from the northwest and south respectively.

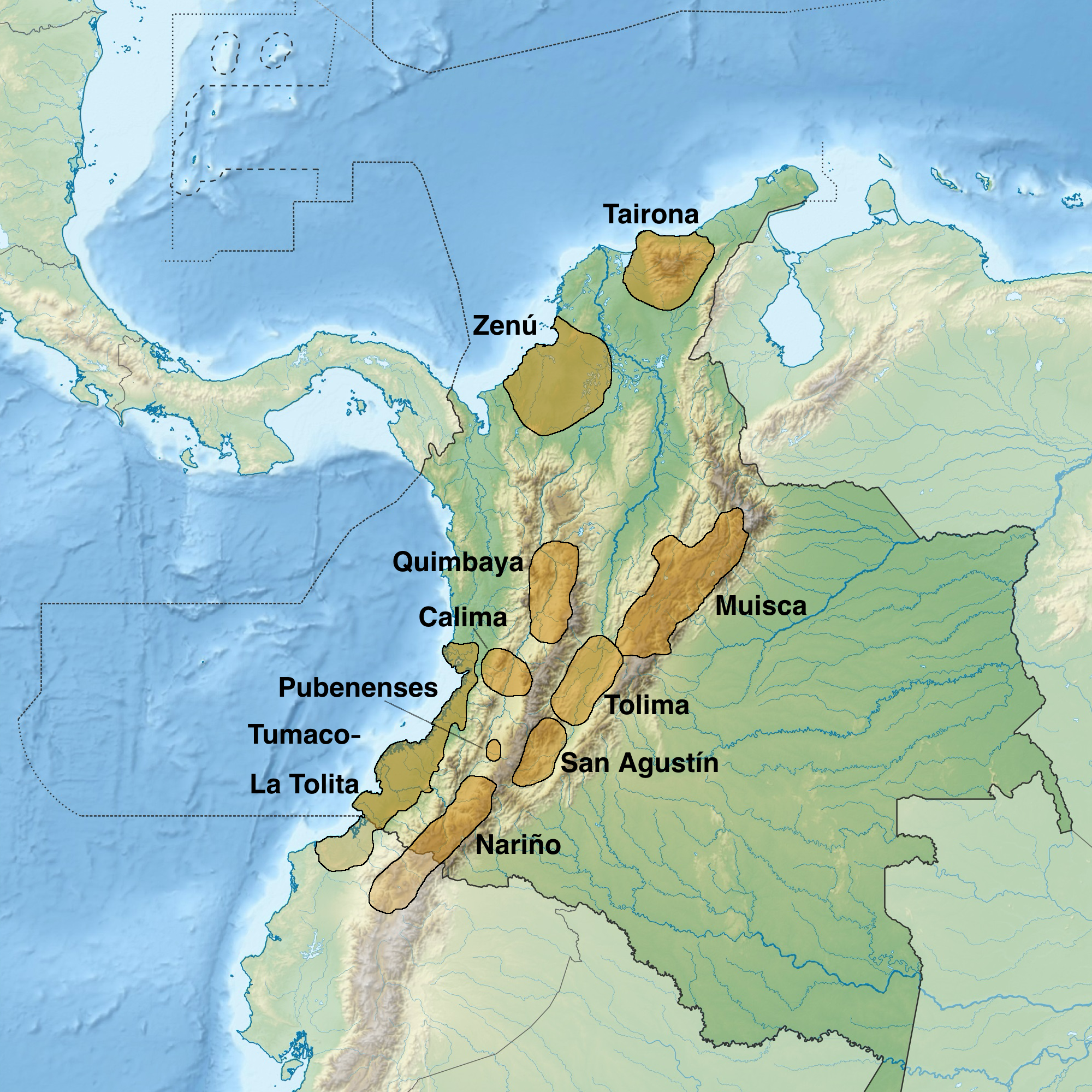
Pre-Columbian cultures

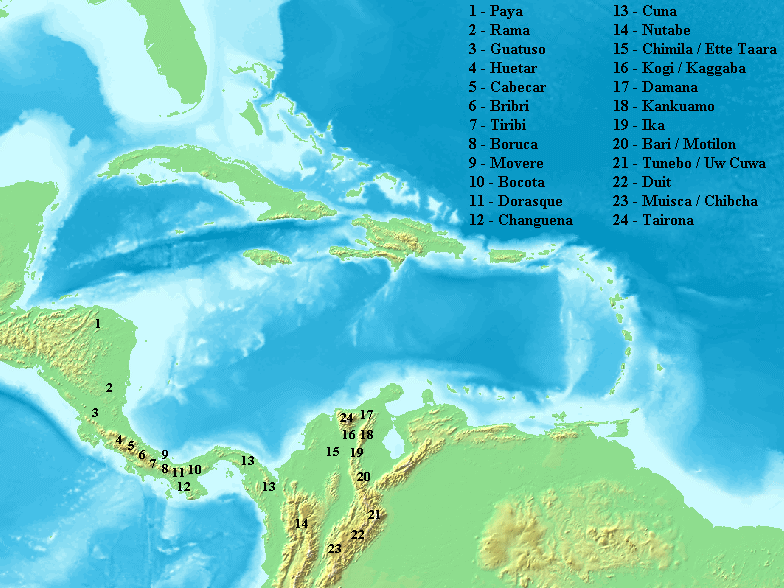
Chibchan Nations

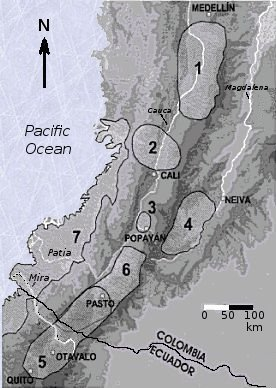
SW cultures

Pre-Columbian peoples, civilisations and cultures of four language groups; Arawakan, Carib, Chibcha, and the isolated Páez language, existed in Colombia with after the Muisca, the Tairona, Calima, Quimbaya and Zenú as important ones

== Conquistadors in Colombia ==
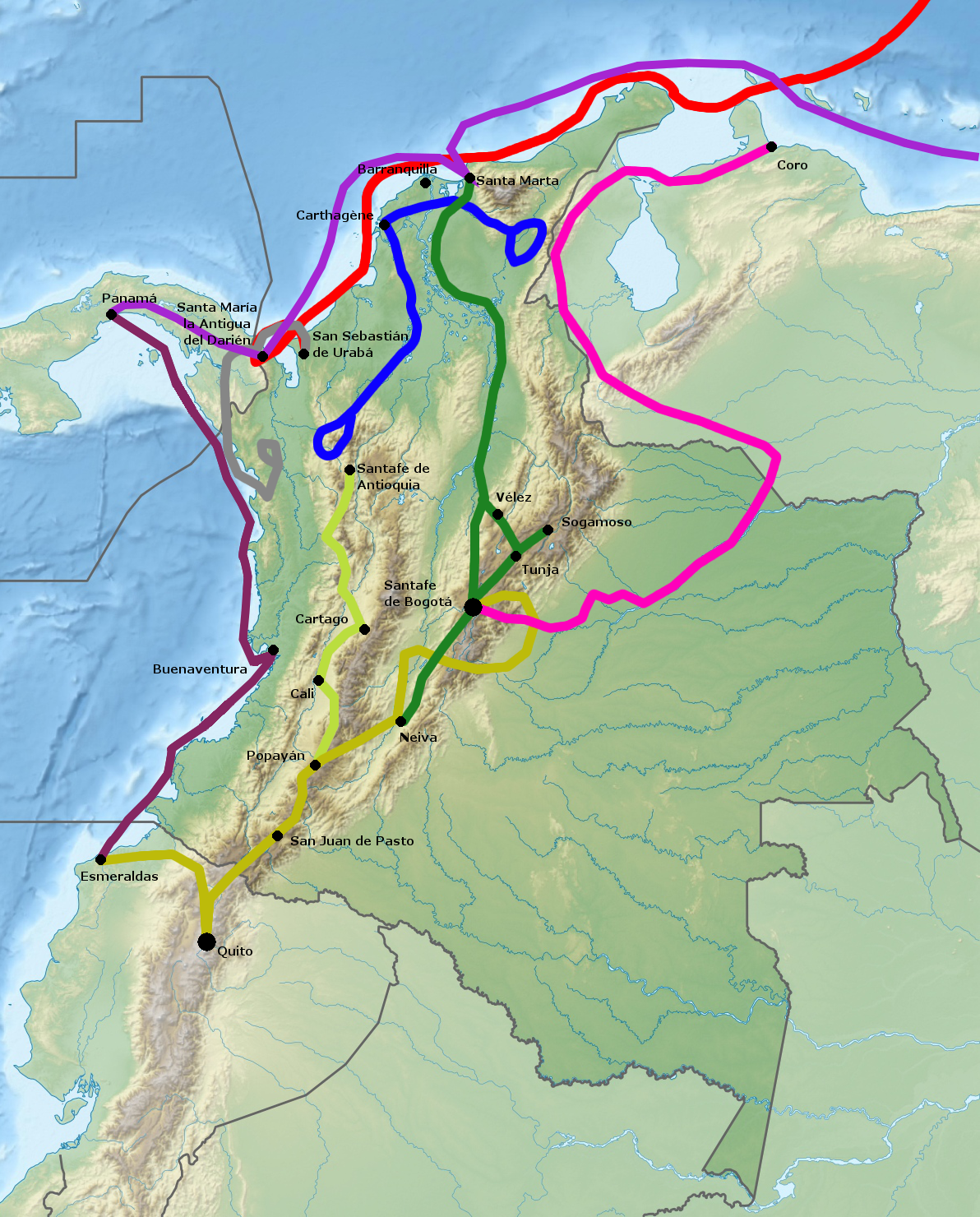
Exploration & conquest of Colombia: **Alonso de Ojeda** (1499–1502 & 1509–10); Francisco Pizarro (1509–10); **Vasco Núñez de Balboa** (1513); Francisco Pizarro; Martín Fernández de Enciso; **Pedro Arias Dávila** (1513–1519); Francisco Pizarro; Diego de Almagro; Sebastián de Belalcázar; Pascual de Andagoya; **Francisco Pizarro** (1515–1529); Diego de Almagro; Pascual de Andagoya; Bartolomé Ruiz; Jorge Robledo; **Pedro de Heredia** (1532–1538); Alonso de Cáceres; **Nikolaus Federmann** (1537–1539); Georg von Speyer; Miguel Holguín y Figueroa; **Gonzalo Jiménez de Quesada** (1536–1539); Hernán Pérez de Quesada; Martín Galeano; Ortún Velázquez de Velasco; Juan de Sanct Martín; Gonzalo Suárez Rendón; Juan del Junco; Bartolomé Camacho Zambrano; Antonio de Lebrija; Lázaro Fonte; Gonzalo Macías; Juan Maldonado; Juan de Céspedes; **Hernán Pérez de Quesada** (1539–1541); Martín Galeano; Lázaro Fonte; **Gonzalo Jiménez de Quesada** (1569–1572); Gonzalo Macías; Juan Maldonado; Legend: • Leader – minor captain Notes: • >1539 expeditions in Llanos Orientales not shown • expedition Pedro de Ursúa not shown

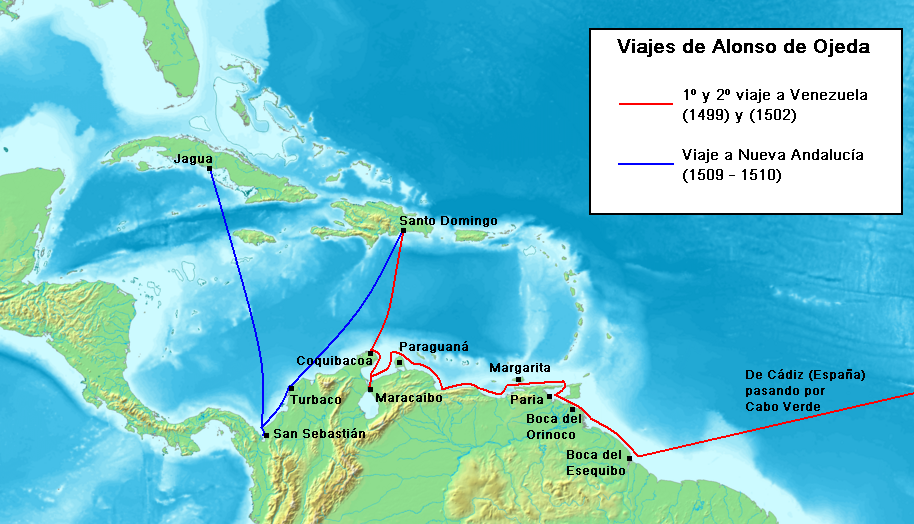
A map of exploration routes of Alonso de Ojeda (1499–1502 & 1509–10) Francisco Pizarro (1509–10)

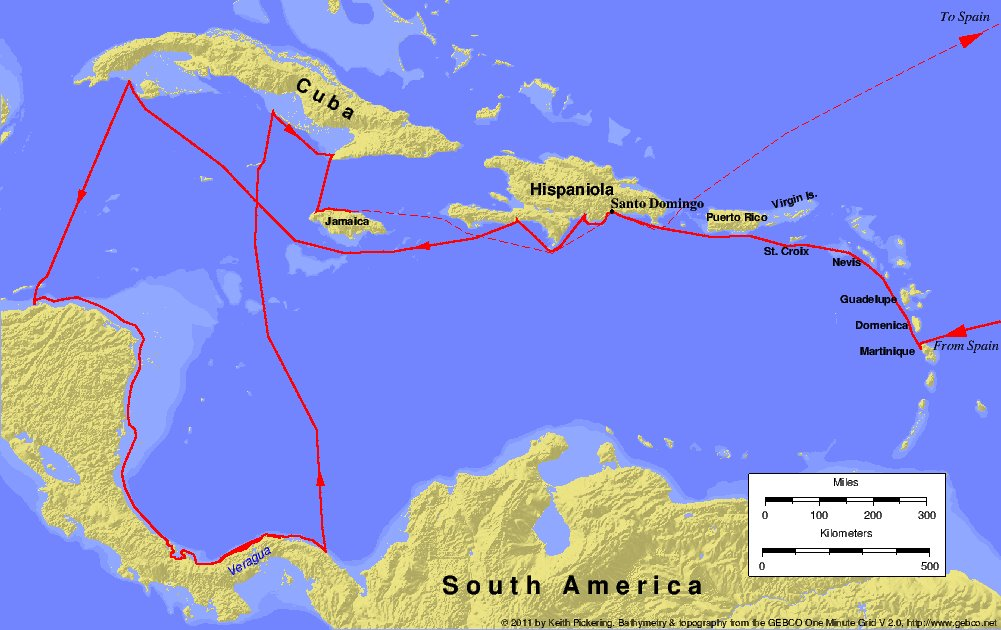
4th voyage of Christopher Columbus, who touched upon later named after him Colombian, now Panamanian lands where he encountered the Kuna people (1502–04)

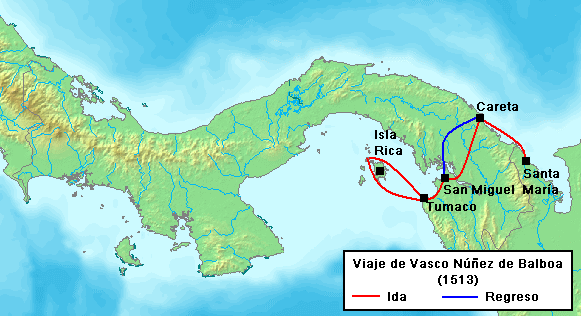
Map of exploration routes of Vasco Núñez de Balboa (1513) Francisco Pizarro Martín Fernández de Enciso

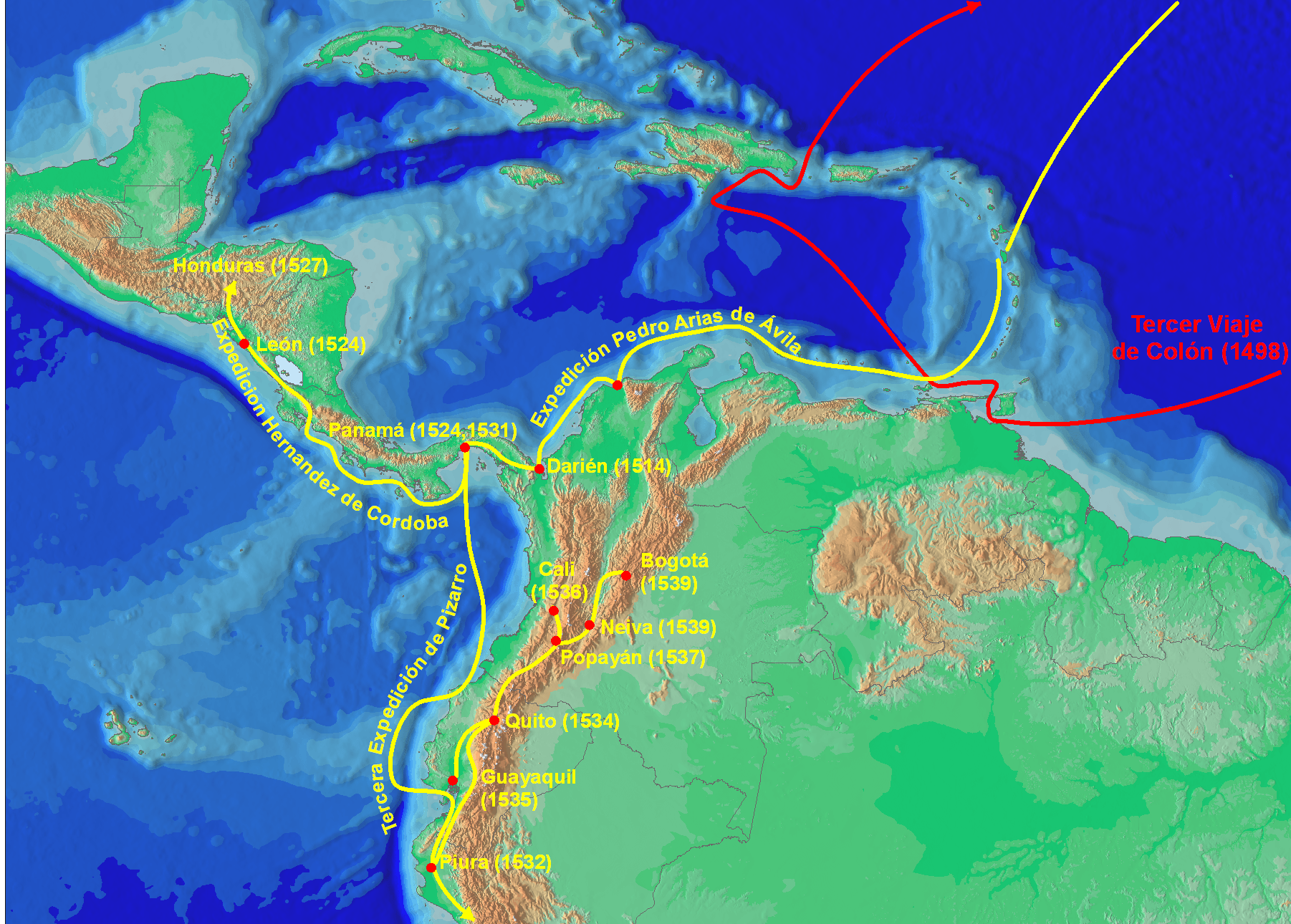
Map of exploration routes of Sebastián de Belalcázar (1514–1539) Jorge Robledo Gaspar de Rodas Juan de Ampudia Baltasar Maldonado

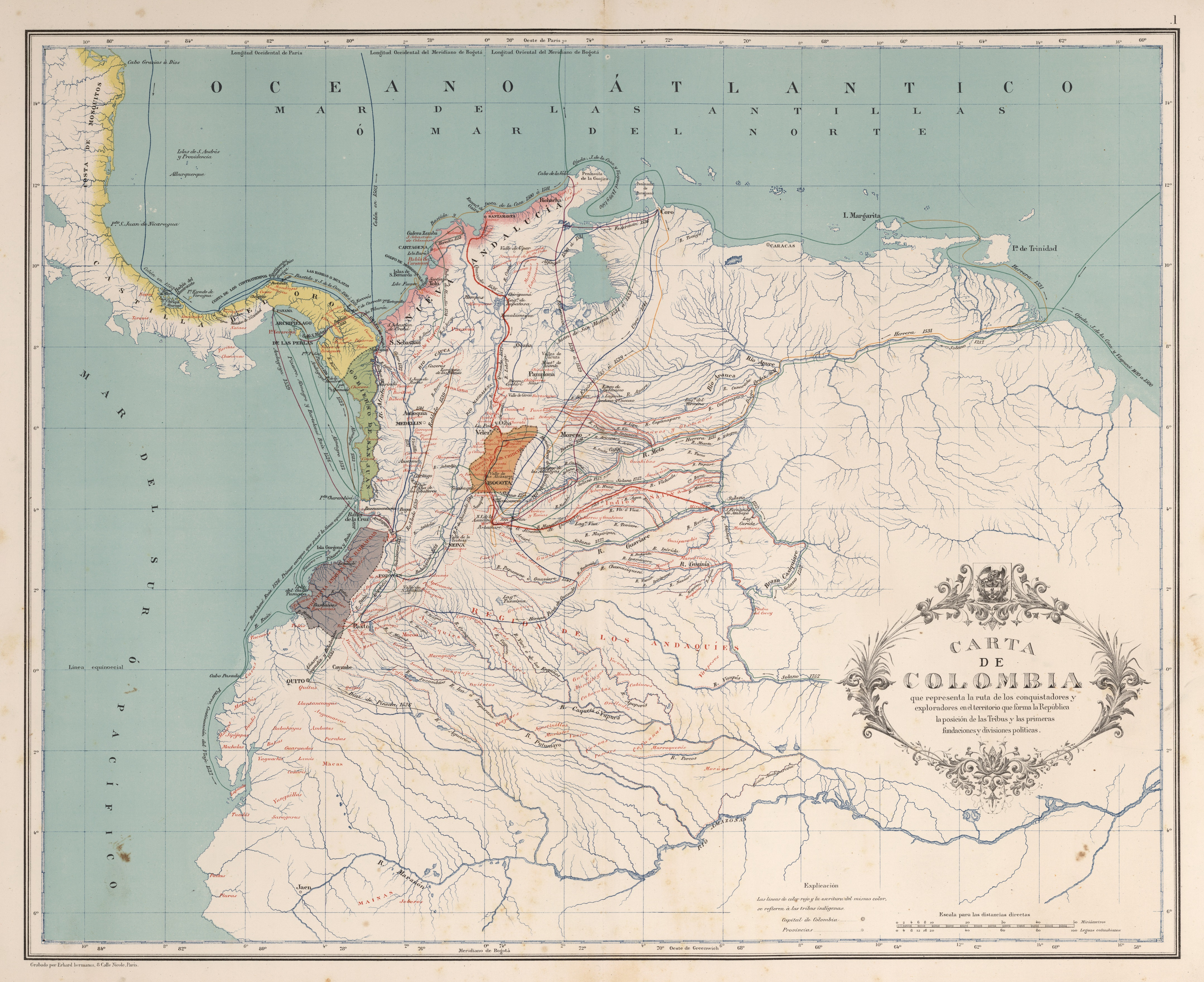
Routes of conquest in Colombia with the former Muisca Confederation in the heart of Colombia in orange by Agustín Codazzi, 1890

| Name leader in bold | Nationality | Years active | Indigenous people encountered bold is conquered ~~conquest failed~~ | Year of death | Image | Notes |
|---|---|---|---|---|---|---|
| **Alonso de Ojeda** | Castilian | 1499–1502; 1509–10 | ~~Wayuu~~; Kuna (2) | 1515 | | |
| **Christopher Columbus** | Genovese | 1502–1504 | Kuna (1) | 1506 | | (Note: Although the country Colombia is named after Columbus, he has never seen the present country of Colombia. Panama, where he disembarked in 1503, was part of (Gran) Colombia until 1903) |
| **Francisco Pizarro** | Extremaduran | 1509–10; 1513; 1515–29 | Kuna (2, 3, 4); **Inca** | 1541 | | |
| Martín Fernández de Enciso | Castilian | 1509–10; 1513–17 | Kuna (2, 3) | 1533 | | |
| **Vasco Núñez de Balboa** | Extremaduran | 1513–19 | Kuna (3) | 1519 | | |
| **Pedro Arias Dávila** | Castilian | 1513–19 | Kuna (3) | 1531 | | |
| Pascual de Andagoya | Basque | 1515–29 | Kuna (4), Inca | 1548 | | |
| Diego de Almagro | Castilian | 1515–29 | Kuna (4); Inca | 1538 | | |
| Bartolomé Ruiz | Castilian | 1515–29 | Kuna (4) | 1532 | | |
| **Sebastián de Belalcázar** | Castilian | 1514–39 | **Paez**; Pijao (1); Sutagao (1); Muisca | 1551 | | |
| **Jorge Robledo** | Castilian | 1514–46 | Paez; Pijao (1); **Nutabe** | 1546 | | (Note: Executed by the Governor of New Granada) |
| Juan de Ampudia | Castilian | 1514–41 | Paez, Pijao (1), Nutabe | 1541 | | |
| Pedro de Añasco | Castilian | 1514–41 | Paez, Pijao (1) | | | |
| Baltasar Maldonado | Castilian | 1534–52 | Inca, Paez, Pijao (1), Quimbaya, Pantágora, **Muisca**, Choque, Inga, Kamëntsá | 1552 | | |
| **Rodrigo de Bastidas** | Castilian | 1524–25 | **Tairona** | 1527 | | |
| Juan de Céspedes | Castilian | 1525–43 | **Tairona**, Chimila (1, 2); **Muisca**; Panche (1), Sutagao (1) | 1573 or 1576 | | |
| **Ambrosius Ehinger** | Bavarian | 1529–33 | Tairona, ~~Wayuu~~; Chimila (1), Motilon (1), Chitarero (1) | 1533 | | |
| **Pedro de Heredia** | Castilian | 1532–38 | **Zenú** | 1554 | | |
| Alonso de Heredia | Castilian | 1532–38 | **Zenú** | | | |
| Alonso de Cáceres | Extremaduran | 1532–38 | Zenú | | | |
| **Georg von Speyer** | Palatinatian | 1535–38 | Motilon (2); Chitarero (1) | 1540 | | |
| **Nikolaus Federmann** | Bavarian | 1535–39 | Motilon (2), Chitarero (1); U'wa, Lache (1); Muisca | 1542 | | |
| Miguel Holguín y Figueroa | Extremaduran | 1535–39 | Motilon (2), Chitarero (1), U'wa, Lache (1), Muisca | 1576> | | |
| Luis Lanchero | Castilian | 1533–39; 1541–1559 | **Muzo** | 1562 | | |
| **Gonzalo Jiménez** **de Quesada** | Granadian | 1536–39; 1569–72 | Tairona, Chimila (2) **zipa** **zaque** **Panche**; Pijao (2) | 1579 | | |
| Juan Maldonado | Castilian | 1536–39; 1569–72 | Tairona, Chimila (2), Muisca, Panche, Pijao (2) | | | (Note: Not the same as Juan Maldonado, who was only 11 in 1536) |
| Pedro Ruíz Corredor | Castilian | 1533–1601 | Tairona, Chimila (2), Muisca, Inca | 1601+ | | |
| Juan de Albarracín | Castilian | 1536–1539 | Tairona, Chimila (2), Muisca, Panche | | | |
| Juan Tafur | Castilian | 1518–1541 | Tairona, Chimila (1,2), Muisca, Panche | | | |
| Martín Yañéz Tafur | Castilian | 1520–1544 | Zenú, Kuna, Panche | | | |
| Antonio Díaz de Cardoso | Portuguese | 1526–41 | Tairona, Chimila (2), Muisca, Panche | | | |
| Gonzalo García Zorro | Extremaduran | 1536–1544 | Tairona, Chimila (2), Muisca, Panche | 1566 | | |
| Gonzalo Macías | Extremaduran | 1536–39; 1569–71 | Tairona, Chimila (2), Muisca, Panche, Pijao (2) | 1571~ | | |
| **Hernán Pérez** **de Quesada** | Granadian | 1536–39; 1540–42 | Tairona, Chimila (2); Muisca, Panche; Lache (2), Chitarero (3); Achagua, Guayupe, Choque, Inga, Kamëntsá | 1544 | | |
| **Gonzalo Suárez Rendón** | Castilian | 1536–39 | Tairona, Chimila (2) zipa, Panche **zaque** | 1590 | | |
| Juan del Junco | Asturian | 1536–41 | Tairona, Chimila (2); Muisca | 15?? | | |
| Martín Galeano | Extremaduran | 1536–39; 1540–45 | Tairona, Chimila (2); Muisca, Panche; Muzo | 1554~ | | |
| Lázaro Fonte | Castilian | 1536–39; 1540–42 | Tairona, Chimila (2); Muisca, Panche; Lache (2), Guayupe | 1542 | | |
| Juan de Sanct Martín | Castilian | 1536–39; 1540–45 | Tairona, Chimila (2); Muisca, Panche; **Guane**; Achagua | | | |
| Hernán Venegas Carrillo | Castilian | 1536–47 | Tairona, Chimila (2), **Panche** | 1583 | | |
| Ortún Velázquez de Velasco | Castilian | 1536–39 | Tairona, Chimila (2), Muisca, Panche, Chitarero (2) | 1584 | | |
| Bartolomé Camacho Zambrano | Extremaduran | 1536–39 | Tairona, Chimila (2), Muisca, Panche | | | |
| Pedro Fernández de Valenzuela | Castilian | 1536–39 | Tairona, Chimila (2), Muisca, Panche | | | |
| **640+ conquistadors** ~80% | mostly Castilian | April 1536 - April 1537 | Diseases, jaguars, crocodiles, climate, various indigenous warfare | 1536; 1537 | | |
| **Gaspar de Rodas** | Extremaduran | 1539–81 | Paez; Pijao; Nutabe | 1607 | | |
| Juan Maldonado | Castilian | 1543–72 | Chitarero (4) | 1572 | | |
| **Pedro de Ursúa** | Navarran | 1545–61 | Panche; ~~Muzo~~; Chitarero (5); Tairona | 1561 | | (Note: Murdered on expedition by some of his men) |
| Juan Taborda | Extremaduran | 1545–69 | Nutabe | 1569 | | |
| Juan Freyle | Castilian | | Panche; ~~Muzo~~; Chitarero (5); Tairona | | | |

== See also ==
- First wave of European colonization
- European colonization of the Americas

- Spanish conquest of Guatemala, Petén
- Maya, Chiapas, Yucatán
- Aztec, Honduras

- Spanish conquest of the Muisca

- Epítome de la conquista del Nuevo Reino de Granada
- El Carnero

- Spanish conquest of the Chibchan Nations
- Spanish conquest of the Inca Empire

== Bibliography ==
- Rodríguez Freyle, Juan; Achury Valenzuela, Darío (1979) [1859 (1638)], El Carnero – Conquista i descubrimiento del nuevo reino de Granada de las Indias Occidentales del mar oceano, i fundacion de la ciudad de Santa Fe de Bogota (PDF) (in Spanish), Fundacion Biblioteca Ayacuch, pp. 1–598
