= Jorge Robledo (conquistador) =

Spanish conquistador (1500–1546)

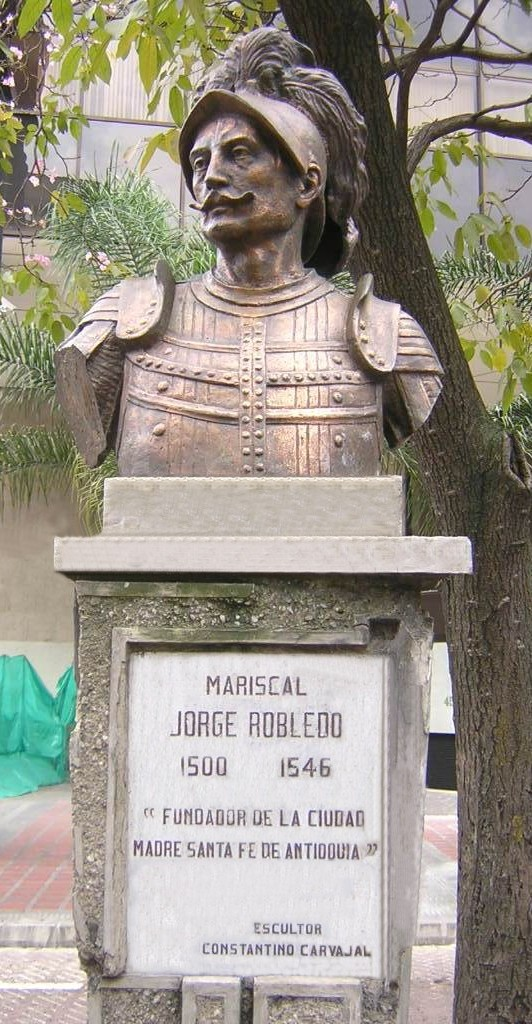
- Bust of Jorge Robledo in Medellín
- Born: 1500; Úbeda, Jaén, Spain
- Died: October 5, 1546 (aged 45–46); La Merced, Caldas, New Kingdom of Granada
- Military career
- Allegiance: Spanish Empire
- Branch: Conquistadors
- Service years: 1521–1543
- Rank: Marshal
- Nicknames: Conquistador of Antioquia; El Mariscal
- Conflicts: Italian War of 1521–1526; Battle of Cajamarca; Conquest of Antioquia

Jorge Robledo (c. 1500, Úbeda, Spain – 5 October 1546, La Merced, Caldas - New Kingdom of Granada) was a Spanish conquistador. He traveled in modern-day Colombia, Guatemala, and Peru and was executed by decapitation by order of Sebastián de Belalcázar.

== Biography ==
Jorge Robledo was born around 1500 in Úbeda, Jaén, Andalusia, Spain, with unknown parents. He is first mentioned in the historical chronicles as soldier in the army of Lorenzo de Aldana, who was sent north by Francisco Pizarro in 1539 towards the newly founded province of Popayán. He founded the cities of Santa Ana de los Caballeros (present-day Anserma, Caldas) on July 26, 1539, Cartago, Valle del Cauca (as Arma) in 1540, and Santa Fe de Antioquia in 1541, beating the Nutabe. After this, he spent three years in Spain where he married María de Carvajal y Mendoza, called La Mariscala. His wife was also from Úbeda. Robledo returned to the New Kingdom of Granada with his spouse and many relatives. Jorge Robledo was executed by decapitation on October 5, 1546, by founder of Popayán Sebastián de Belalcázar, in whose expedition he was a captain, over a dispute of the Governorship of these towns. His widow Mariá de Carvajal later remarried first Pedro Briceño and later president of the Audiencia Francisco Briceño.

== Gallery ==
Shield of Jorge Robledo

Signature of Jorge Robledo

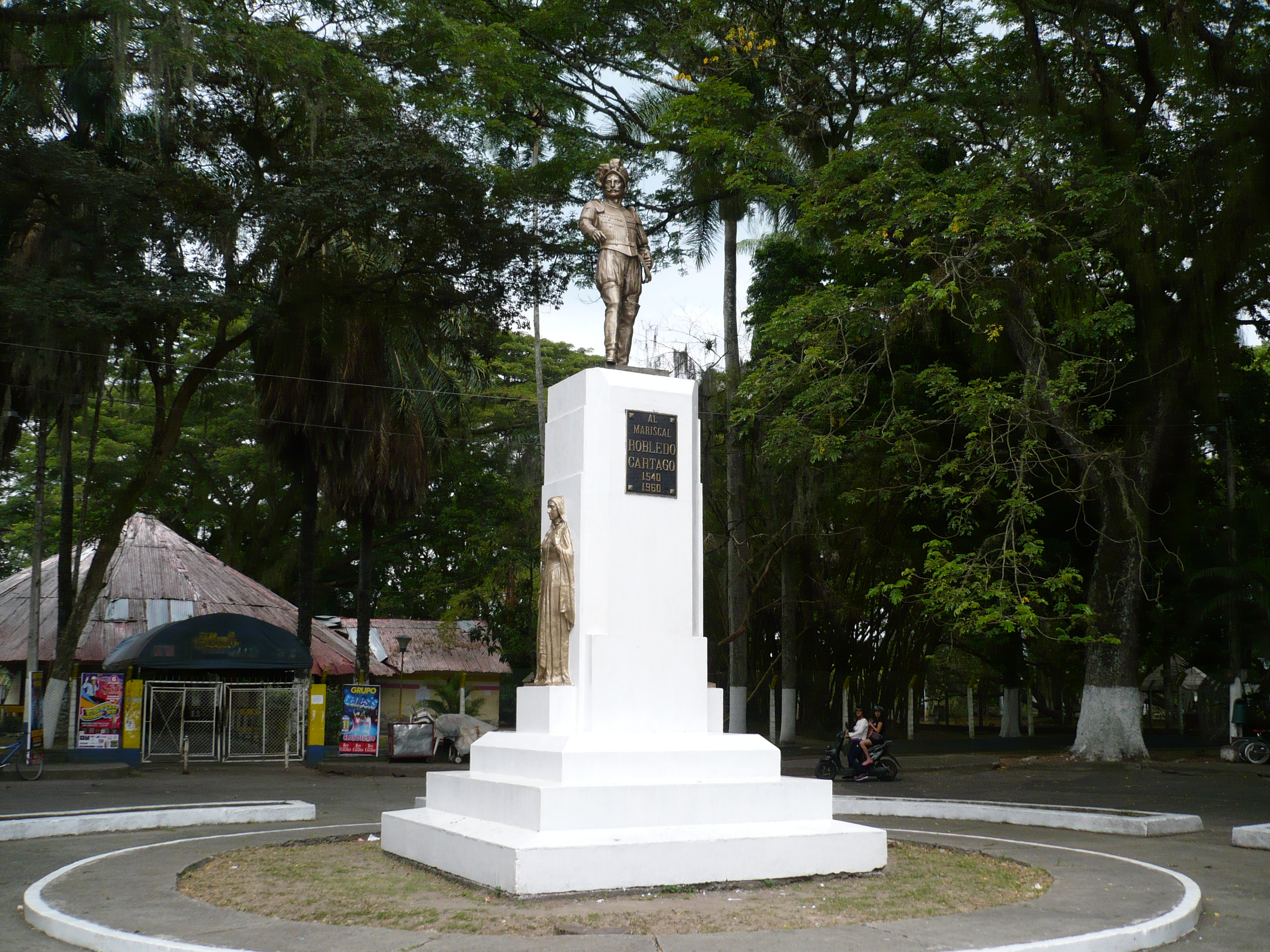
Statue of Jorge Robledo in Cartago, Valle del Cauca

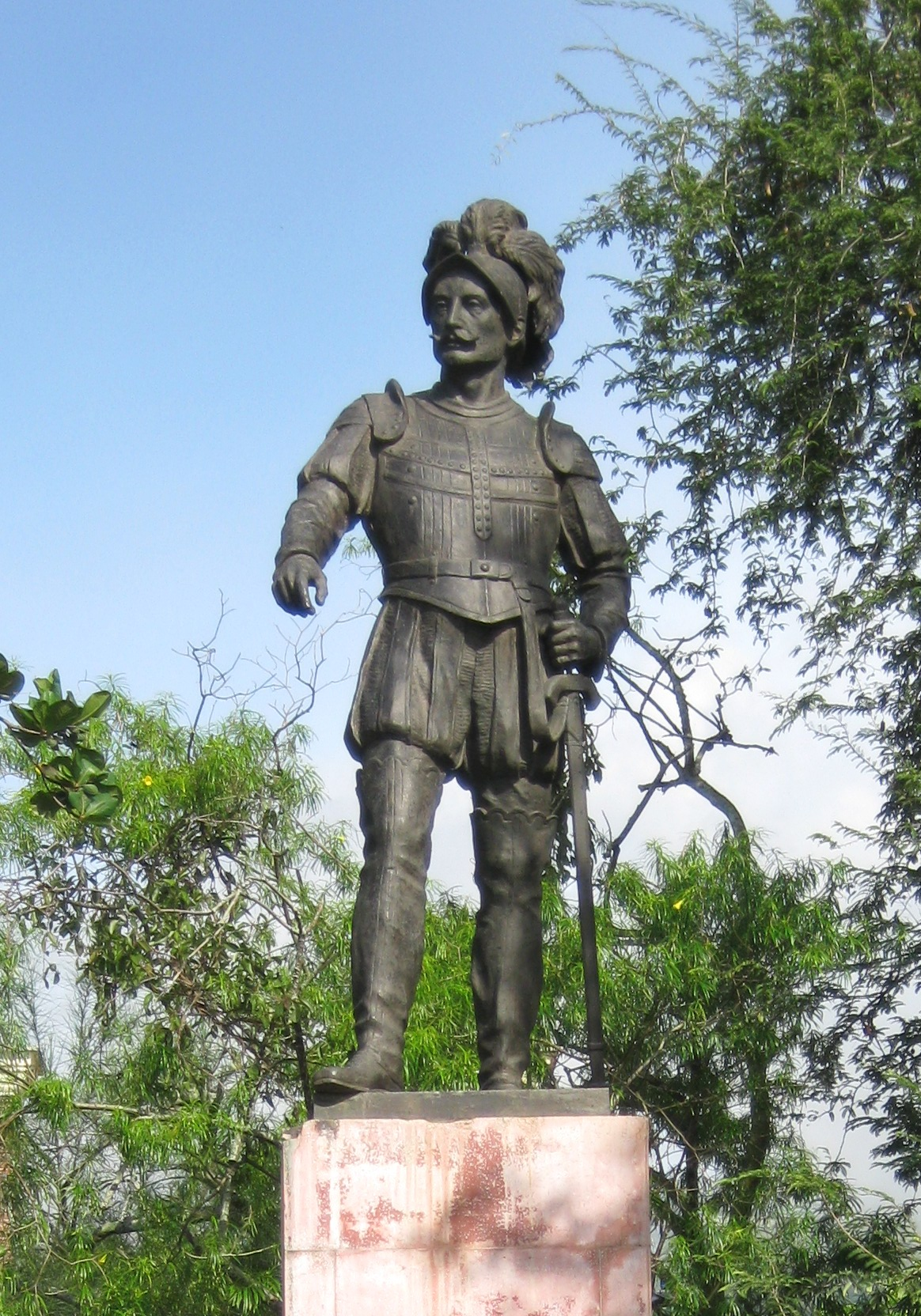
Statue of Robledo in Santa Fe de Antioquia

== See also ==
- Spanish conquest of the Chibchan Nations
- List of conquistadors in Colombia

== Bibliography ==
- Rodríguez Freyle, Juan; Achury Valenzuela, Darío (1979) [1859 (1638)], El Carnero - Conquista i descubrimiento del nuevo reino de Granada de las Indias Occidentales del mar oceano, i fundacion de la ciudad de Santa Fe de Bogota (PDF) (in Spanish), Fundacion Biblioteca Ayacuch, pp. 1–598
