= Gonzalo Suárez Rendón =

Spanish conquistador

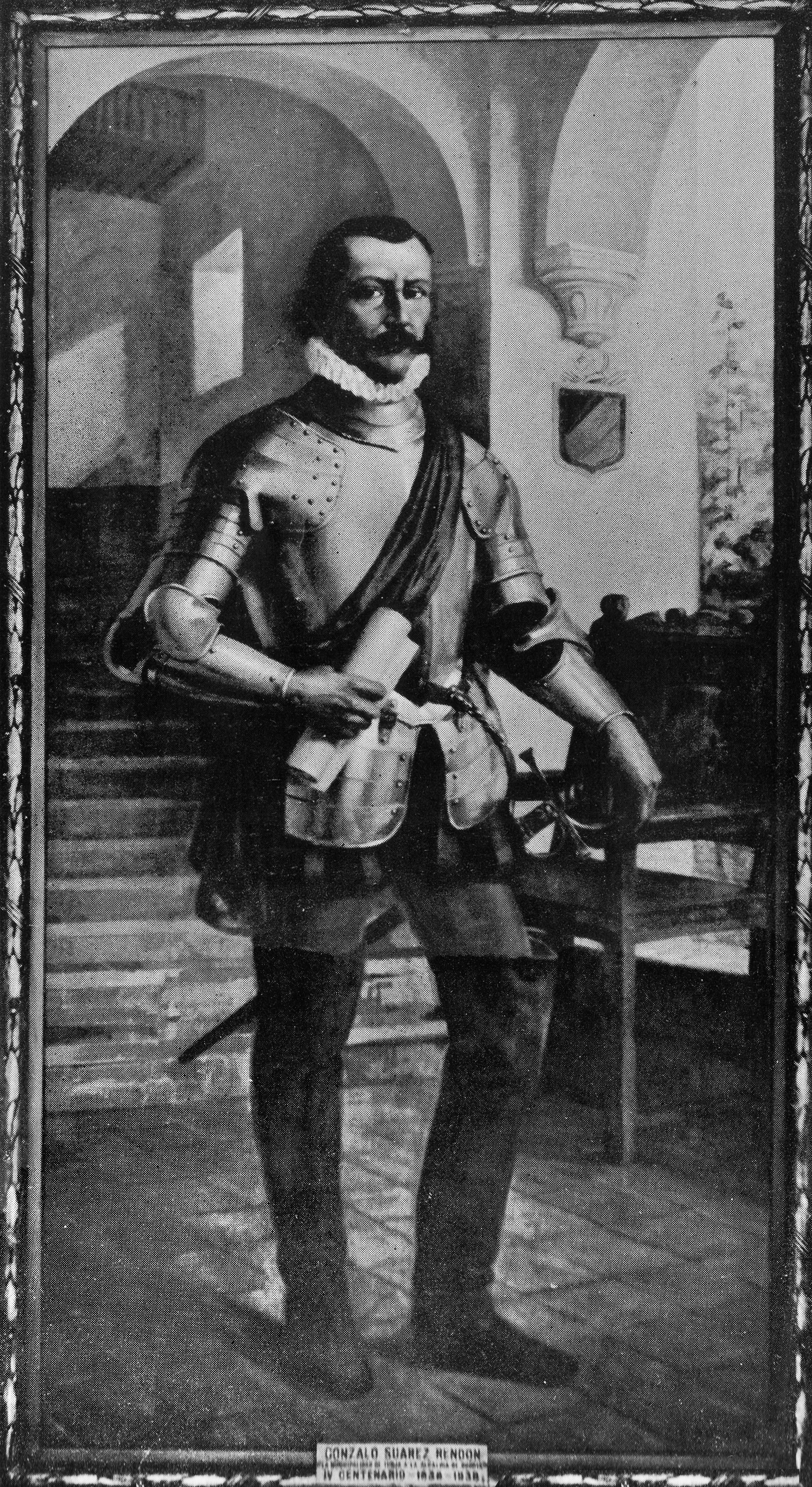
- Portrait of Gonzalo Suárez Rendón
- Born: c.1503 Málaga, Castile
- Died: 1590 (or 1583); Tunja, New Kingdom of Granada
- Burial place: Cathedral of Tunja
- Monuments: Casa Fundador Gonzalo Suárez Rendón
- Occupations: Conquistador
- Years active: 1536–1539
- Employer: Spanish Crown
- Known for: Spanish conquest of the Muisca; Founder of Tunja
- Spouse: Mencia de Figueroa y Godoy
- Children: 2 sons: Nicolas & Miguel Suárez de Figueroa; 2 daughters: Isabel de Godoy & María de la Trinidad Suárez de Figueroa
- Parents: Rodrigo Suárez Rendón de Jerez (father); Isabel Jiménez Suárez (mother)
- Relatives: Rodrigo Sabariego Suárez Rendón (brother); María Suárez Rendón (sister)

Signature
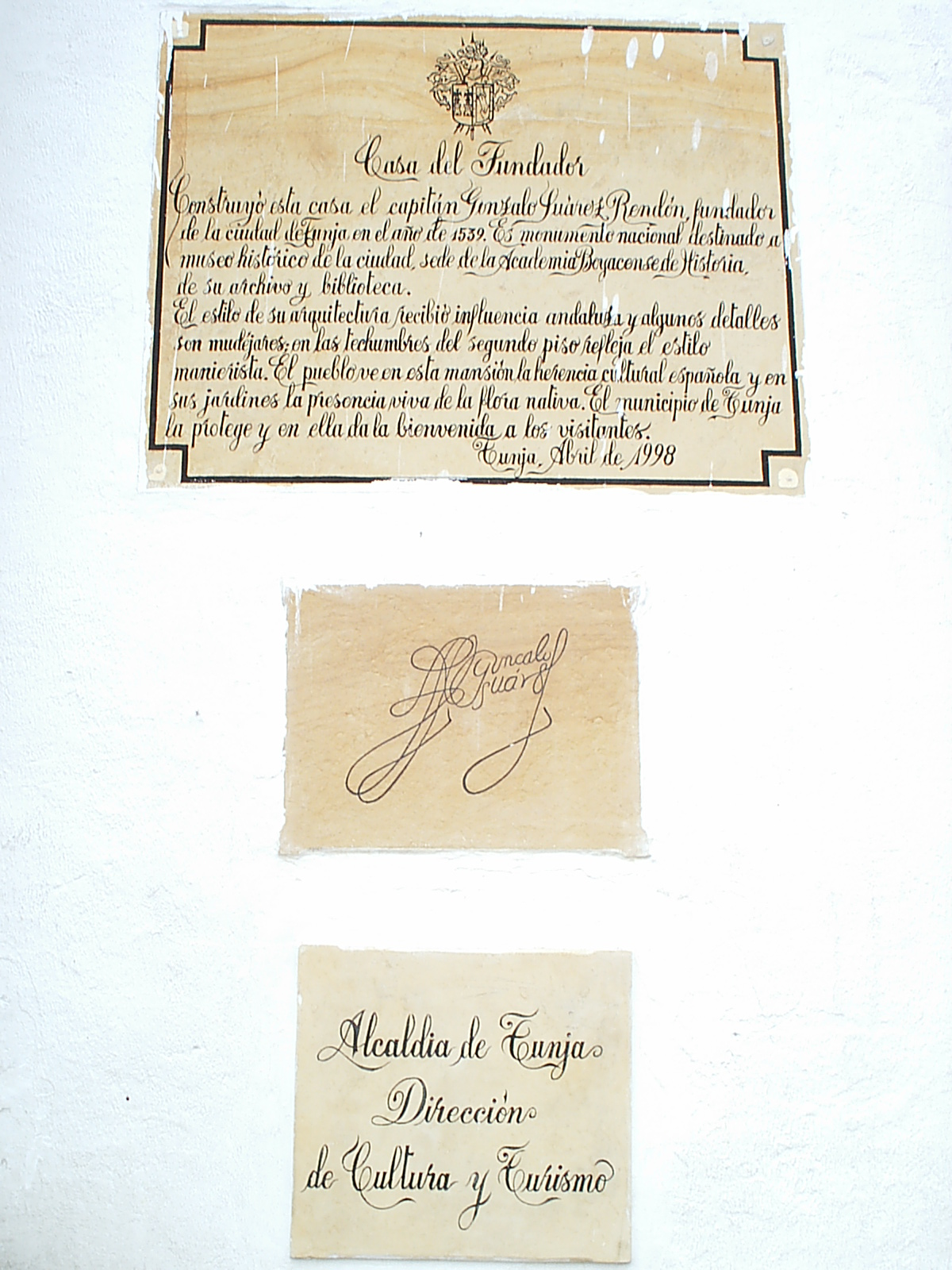

Gonzalo Suárez Rendón (c.1503, Málaga, Castile – 1590 (or 1583), Tunja, New Kingdom of Granada) was a Spanish crusader and conquistador, known as the founder of the capital of Boyacá; Tunja, second city of the New Kingdom of Granada. A veteran of the Italian Wars, he also fought at the Conquest of Tunis, Germany, Austria (Battle of Vienna) and Hungary, before taking part in the Spanish conquest of the Muisca people led by Gonzalo Jiménez de Quesada, and later by his brother Hernán Pérez de Quesada. On August 6, 1539, he founded Tunja on the site of the former seat of the hoa (ruler) of the Hunza.

Gonzalo Suárez Rendón is mentioned in the work of uncertain authorship Epítome de la conquista del Nuevo Reino de Granada as "Suarex".

== Biography ==
=== Personal life and career in Europe ===
Gonzalo Suárez Rendón was born around 1503 in the Andalusian city of Málaga to Rodrigo Suárez Rendón de Jerez and Isabel Jiménez, or Ximénez, Suárez. He had one brother and one sister: Rodrigo Sabariego Suárez Rendon; and María Suárez Rendón. He married Mencia de Figueroa y Godoy in 1563 and the couple had four children: two sons and two daughters. His paternal grandfather was Gonzalo Suárez Rendón, his great-grandfather Antonio Sánchez Rendón and his third grandparents along the same line García Rendón and Catalina de Suárez. Ancestry of men who served the King and the Catholic faith in the war against the Moors, according to his proof of ancestry issued in 1571. His merits of military career in Europe, as well as those executed during the conquest and at the founding of Tunja, are found in the General Archive of Indie in Seville, Patronato Real, where his participation in the wars in Italy, Hungary, Germany and France and his promotions that qualified him as Captain are specified. He was present in the Christian armies during the fights against the Turks under the orders of Suleyman the Magnificent. After the wars abroad, Suárez returned to Spain, soon to join the adventure of the expeditions. Already by the sixteenth century they had the freedom to form private companies, through capitulations with the government, in exchange for privileges and official positions for the same businessmen. His was a concrete and exemplary case of those private initiatives for the colonization of America, who, with his experience and military discipline, organized at his own expense a Company that would initially go to Tunisia, but the organization of said campaign was prolonged, so it ended on the voyage of discovery and conquest alongside the Adelantado of Canary Islands, Pedro Fernández de Lugo, who signed capitulations, and in compliance with which they had to find a land path to Peru and the origin of the Magdalena River, but ended up discovering the Muisca and founding the New Kingdom of Granada.

== Madonna of Bogota ==
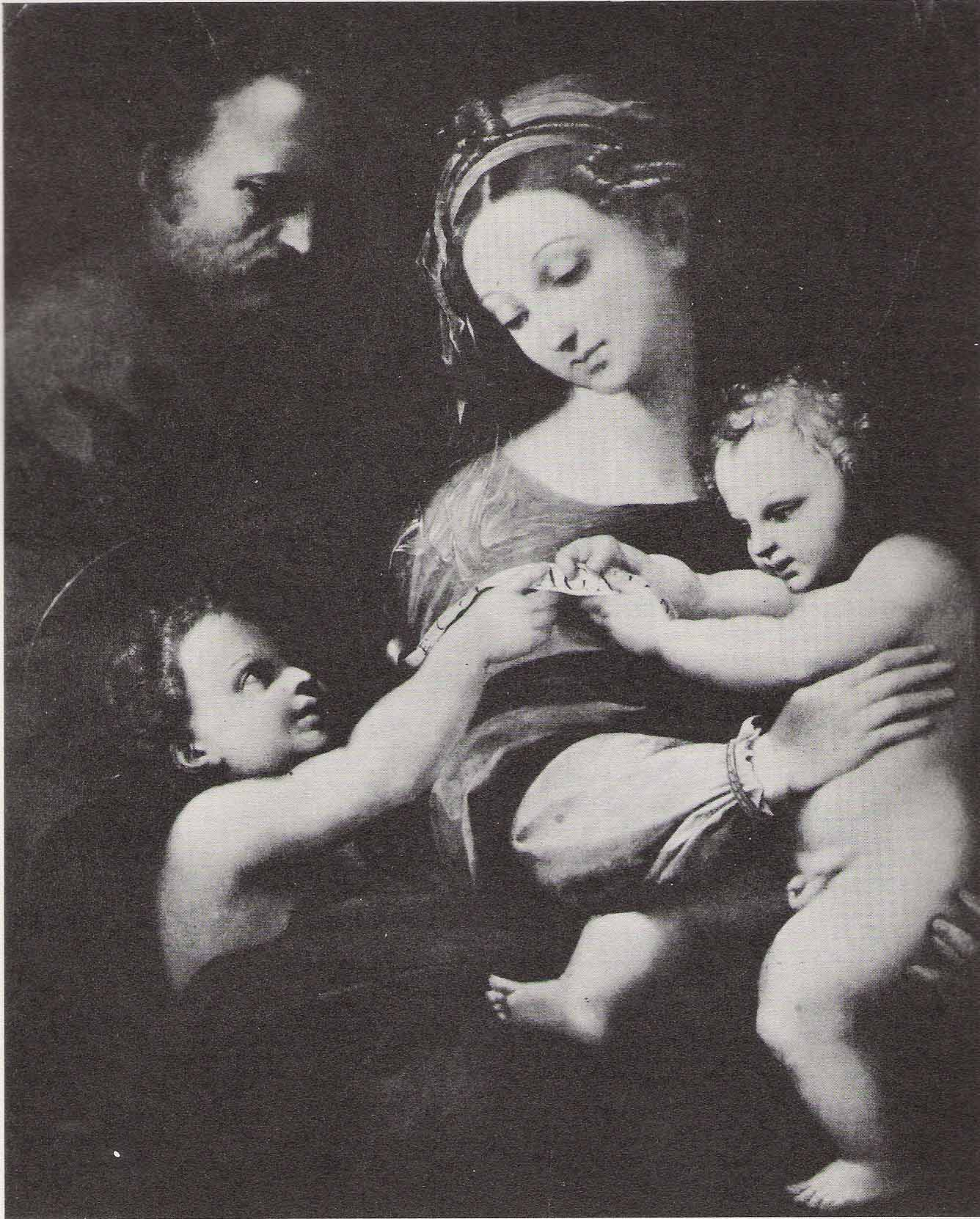
"La Madonna de Bogota" by Raphael, awarded to Gonzalo Suárez Rendón by Emperor Charles V after the Battle of Pavia.

Gonzalo Suárez Rendón was awarded one of the last paintings of Raphael, known as "La Madonna de Bogota" by Emperor Charles V as a war trophy for his service after the Battle of Pavia. The painting was confiscated from the French King Francis I, who was captured during the battle. Gonzalo Suárez Rendón brought the painting to the New World.

== American expeditions ==
In the month of April 1536, in a long expedition led by Gonzalo Jiménez de Quesada to the Andes Mountains. This expedition departed from Santa Marta made up of 800 Spanish soldiers and an unknown number of indigenous companions and negro slaves. In it Suárez Rendón who held the position of cavalry captain. The days were exhausting, with difficult daily marches in swamps and mangroves and numerous sacrifices and calamities lurking in torrential rains and a scorching sun. Food came from what they found and, often, dogs and horses had to be sacrificed for sustenance, something that at a certain point Jiménez de Quesada had to prohibit on death knell. They also suffered from the hostility of the native peoples, who caused heavy casualties.

The objective of this expedition was initially to find a way to Peru, in addition to exploring the territory, the search for riches that were thought to be treasured by the primitive settlers. The expedition followed the ascending course of the Magdalena River reaching Barrancabermeja, where they took the path of salt and other products that were traded by the various tribes of the highlands. Following the course of the Opón River, they ascended towards the eastern mountain range, arriving at the current location of the city of Vélez and making contact with the Muisca people. Of the 800 expeditionaries who had left Santa Marta, only 180 managed to reach the Cordillera region alive, where the city of Santafé de Bogotá was founded on August 6, 1538.

After Santfé de Bogotá, in 1539, Gonzalo Suárez Rendón founded the city of Tunja. As was mandatory, the layout was organized, the land to be occupied by the church and other administrative dependencies was marked out, and lots were distributed among the conquerors who took part in the foundation. The first priest that Tunja had was Fray Vicente de Requejada.

For 4 years, Suárez Rendón was the chief justice of the newly founded city, and as the person in charge of its development, he dedicated himself to equipping it with the most essential things, making it prosper and maintaining order among the indigenous people who did not willingly accept coexistence with the Spaniards.

The Suárez River, which the conquistadors followed to reach the Altiplano Cundiboyacense in early 1537, was named after Suárez Rendón when his horse drowned in it.

Together with Hernán Pérez de Quesada and Gonzalo García Zorro, Suárez Rendón was one of the torturers of the last psihipqua, Sagipa.

== Visionary projects as settler ==
In the first years, the development of Tunja was numbed, because before 1546, the cattle of European origin that entered the Bogotá plain and the entire Andean zone, had to be raised from Santa Marta following the Magdalena riverbed to Barrancabermeja and then go up the Opon riverbed. This maneuver astonishingly increased the final price of cattle. Suárez Rendón and the first members of the council (cabildo) managed to get the Royal Audience of Santo Domingo to find a solution to the problem and in 1546 the Extremaduran captain Francisco Ruiz departing from Cumaná, on the Venezuelan coast, with 60 soldiers traced a path that, passing through El Tocuyo, reached Tunja.

After two years, this solution was materialized assuming a considerable reduction in the price of cattle. Before having this livestock track, a horse was worth 500 pesos in Tunja, a cow 100 and a sheep 20. When the track was opened, in Tunja a horse was worth 40 pesos, a cow was worth 4 pesos and a sheep was worth half a peso.

== Later years ==
During late 1544, at the Cabo de la Vela, Hernán Pérez de Quesada was killed by lightning, as was his brother Francisco, struck down by the electric shock; while Suárez Rendón broke his leg when he was thrown by the impact of the deadly spark.

When in 1561 the threat of the "tyrant" Lope de Aguirre occurred in Venezuela, Suárez Rendón left Tunja with the forces that had gathered to fight Aguirre, who was entrenched in the Venezuelan city of Barquisimeto. Those from Tunja did not really intervene, because when they arrived they had already murdered the tyrant.

Suárez Rendón had one of the most luxurious houses of the Neogranadine period built in Tunja; housing that in addition to housing the family, on several occasions was used as an institutional unit to hold meetings of the Cabildo and other matters such as making important decisions regarding the needs of the city.

He was married to Mencía de Figueroa y Godoy.

== House in Tunja ==
The house built by Suárez Rendon, (Casa del Fundador Gonzalo Suárez Rendón), between August 7, 1539, the day after the foundation of Tunja, and 1570, still exists as the oldest colonial building in Tunja and the only remaining house of a colonial city founder in Latin America; it has been a museum since 1965.

== Gallery ==
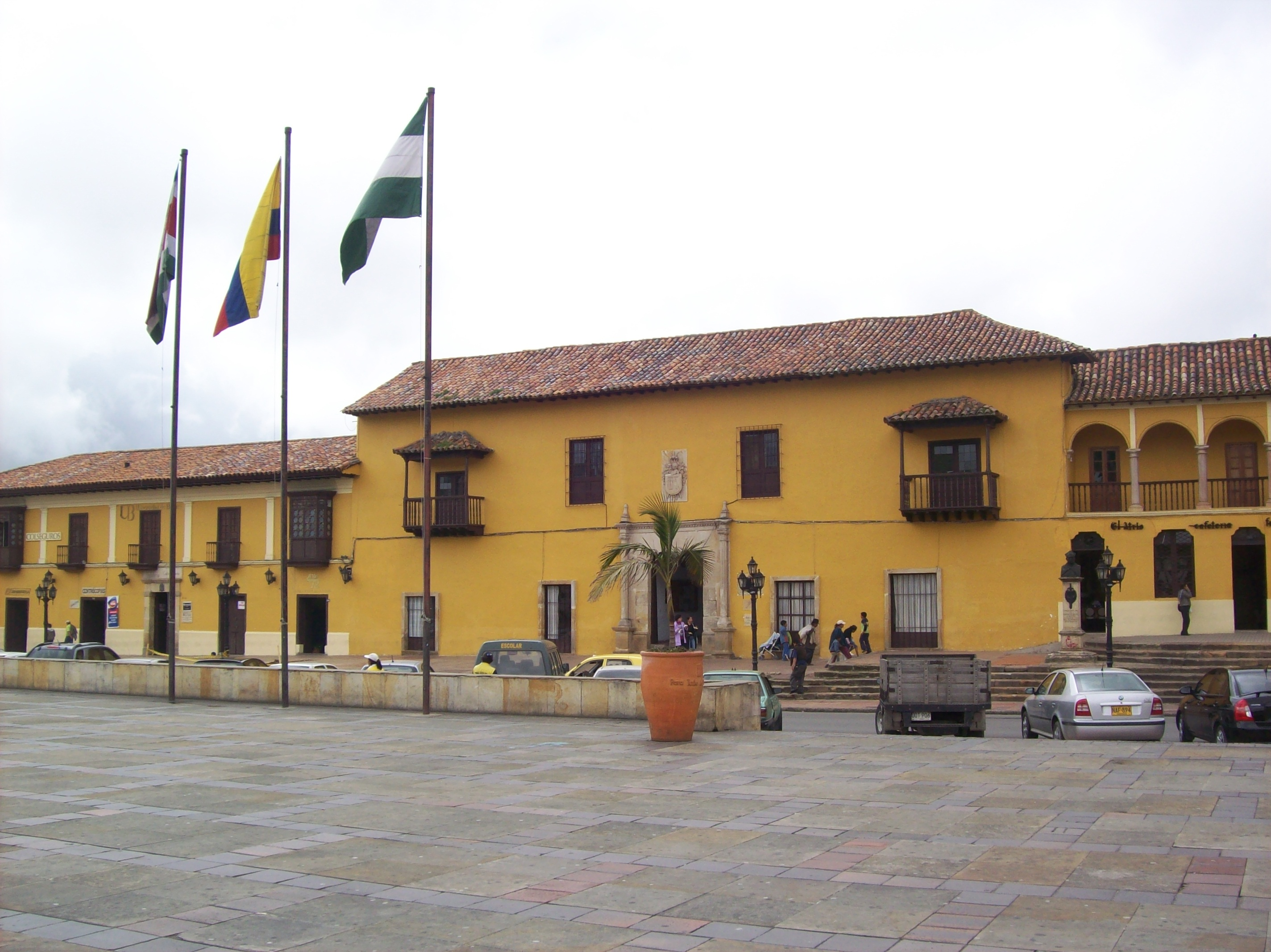
Casa Fundador Gonzalo Suárez Rendón on the Plaza Bolívar in Tunja

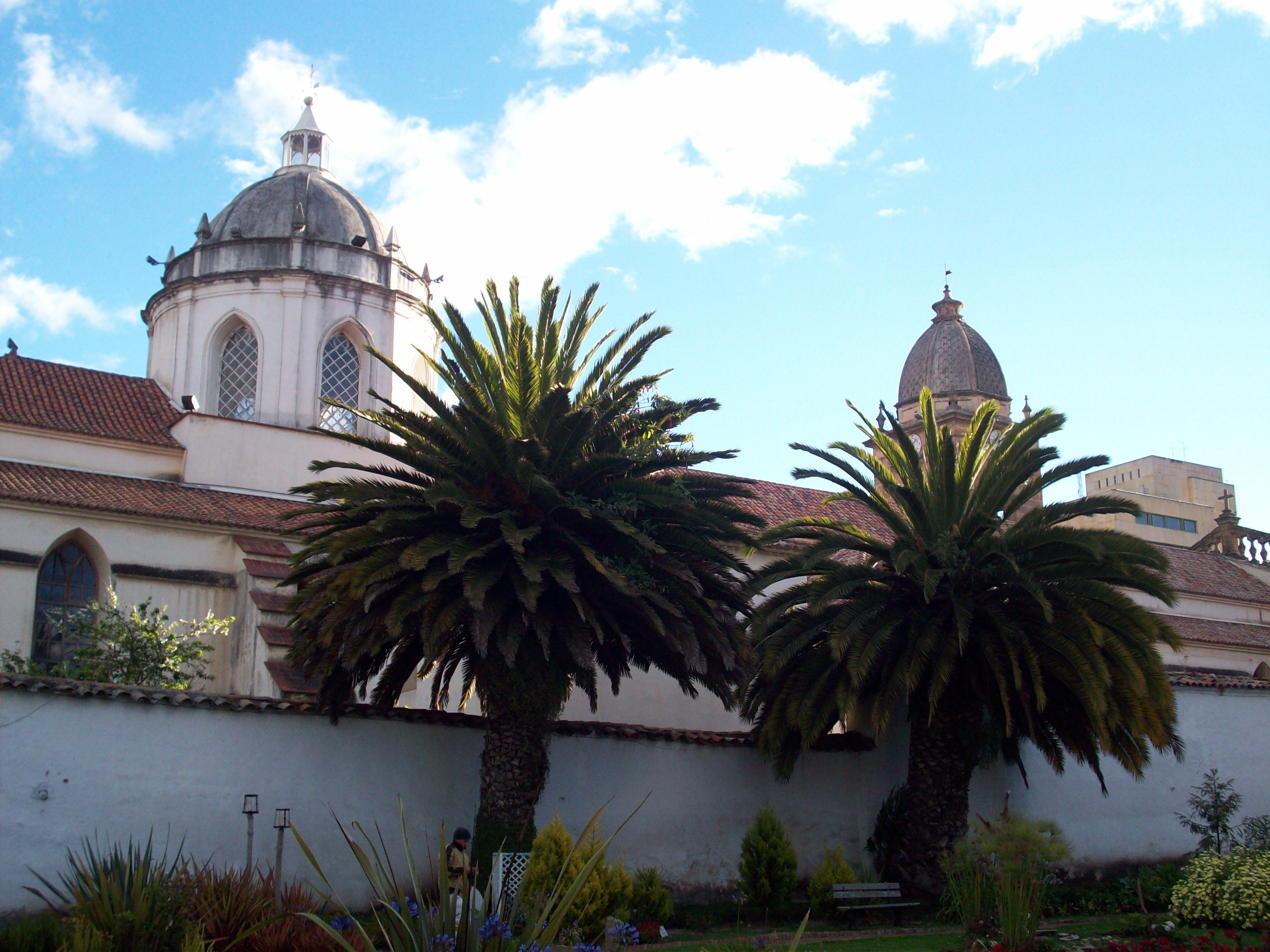
Casa Fundador Gonzalo Suárez Rendón

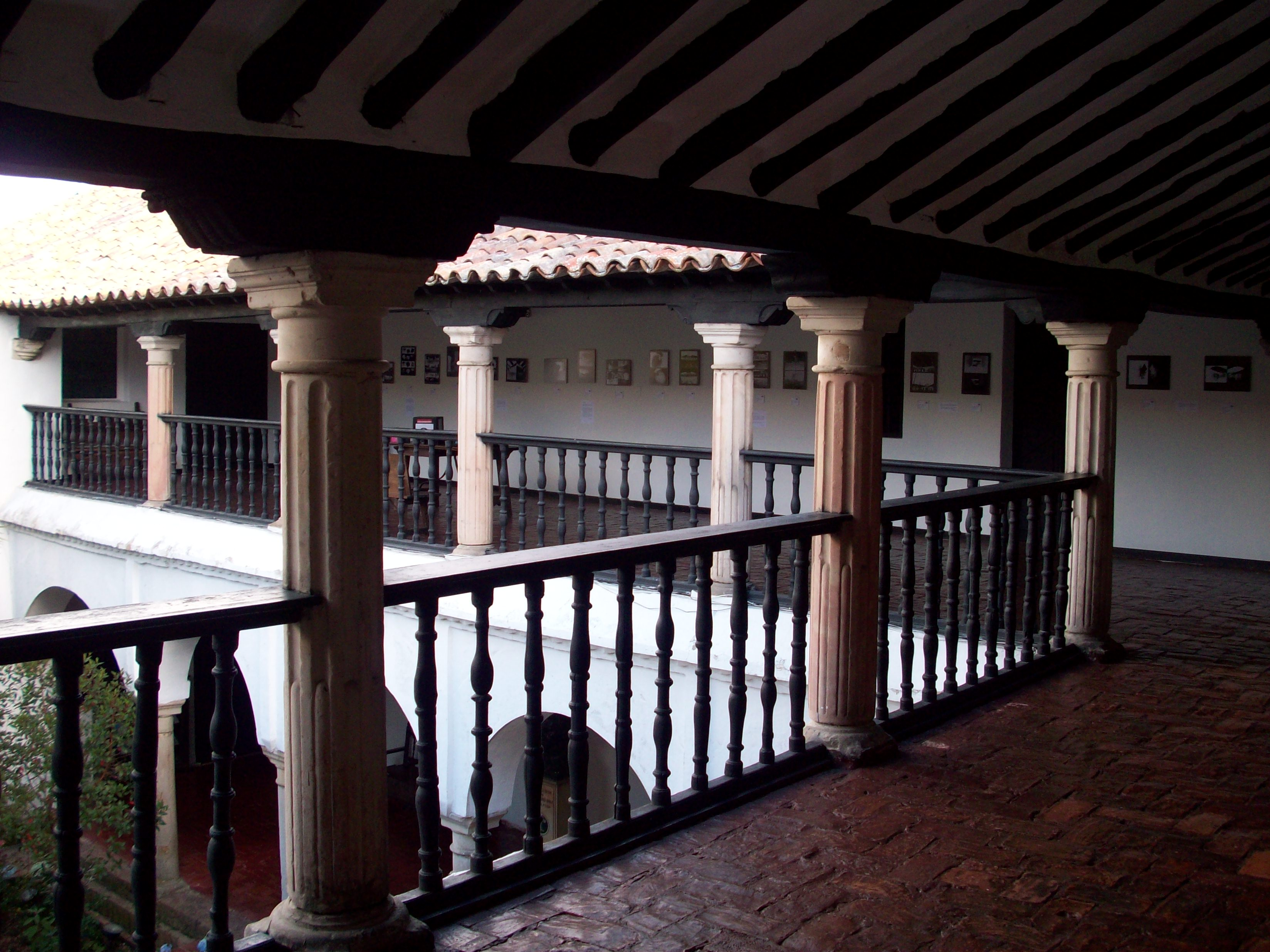
Casa Fundador Gonzalo Suárez Rendón

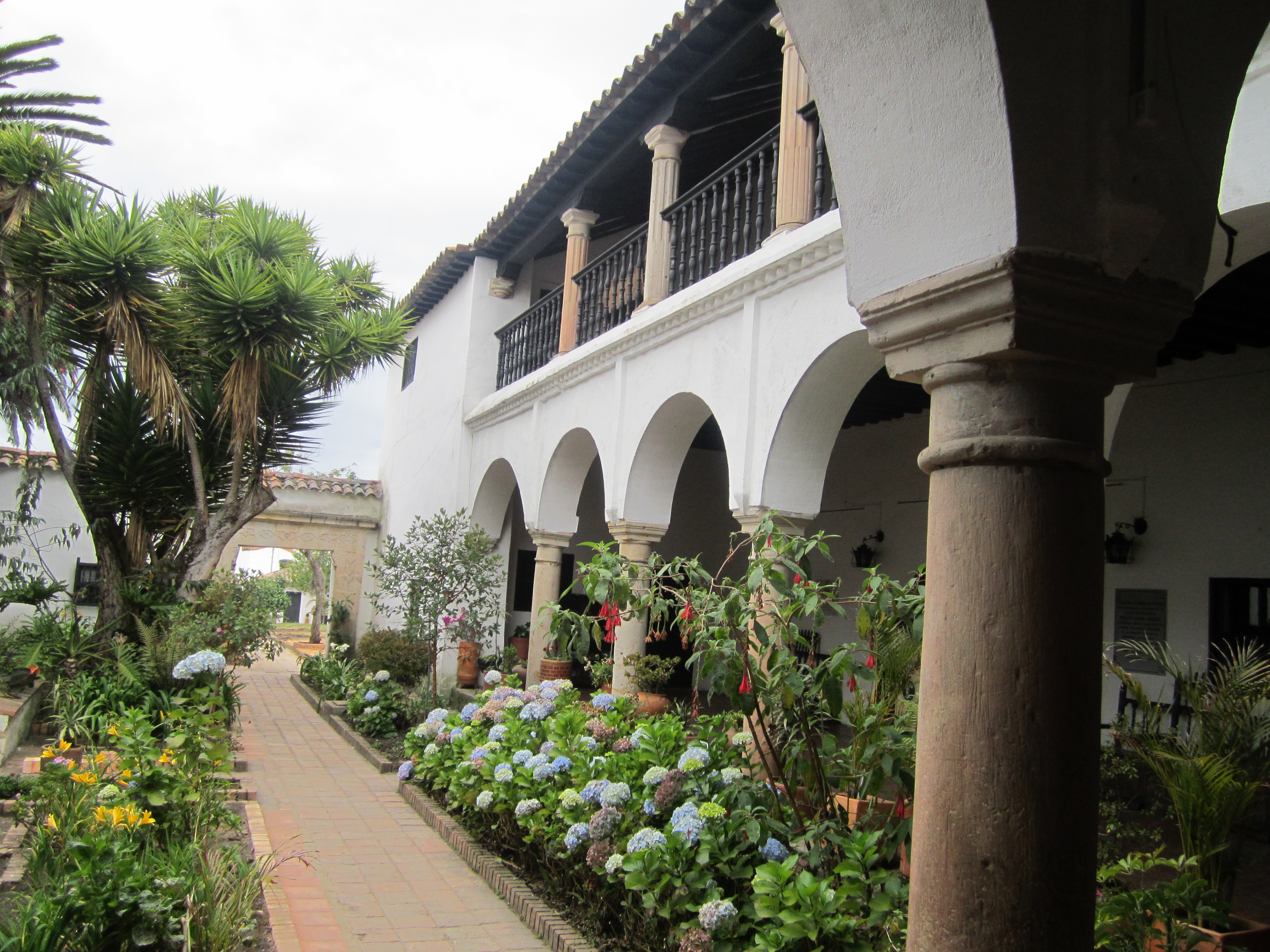
Casa Fundador Gonzalo Suárez Rendón
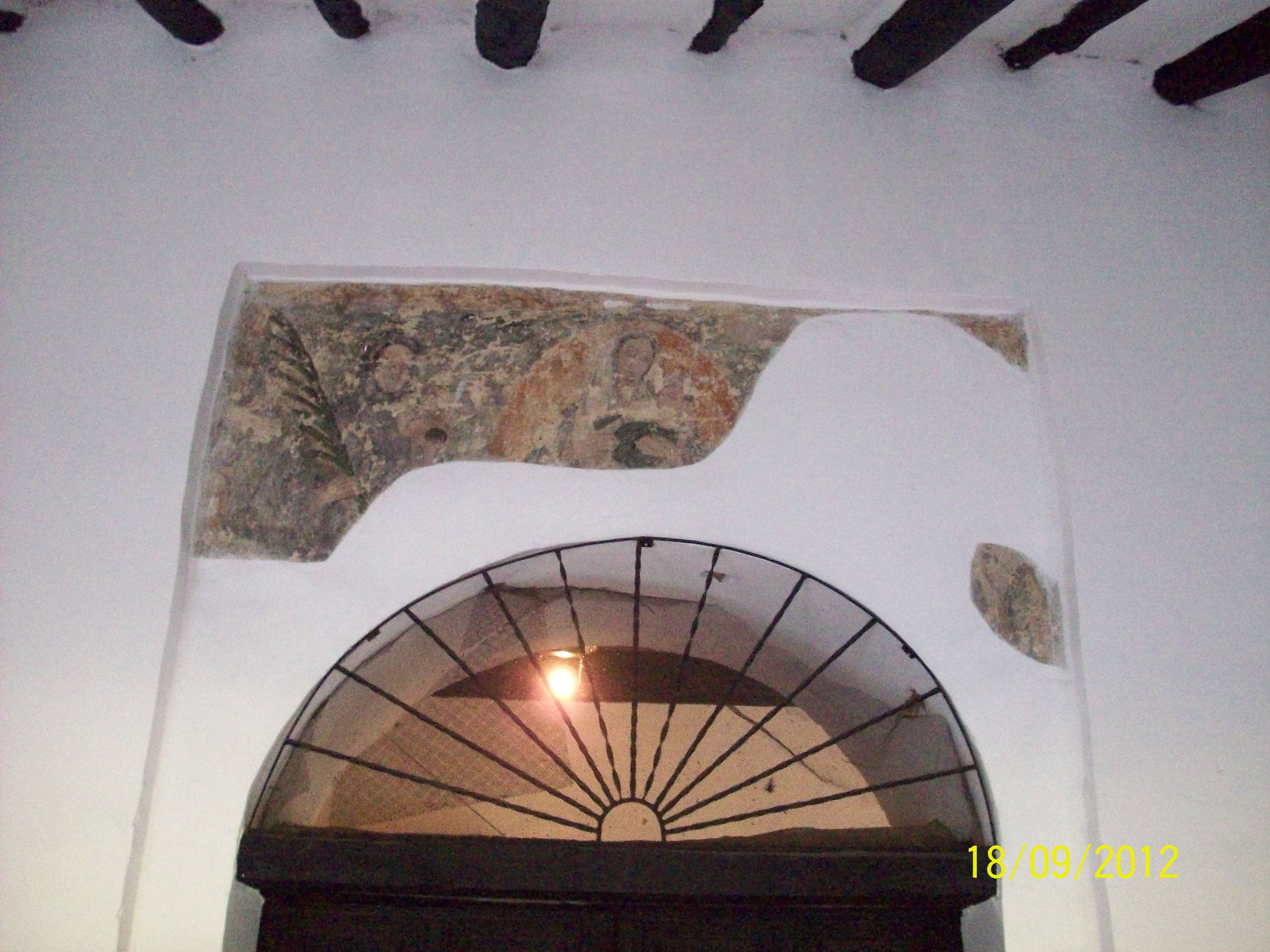
Casa

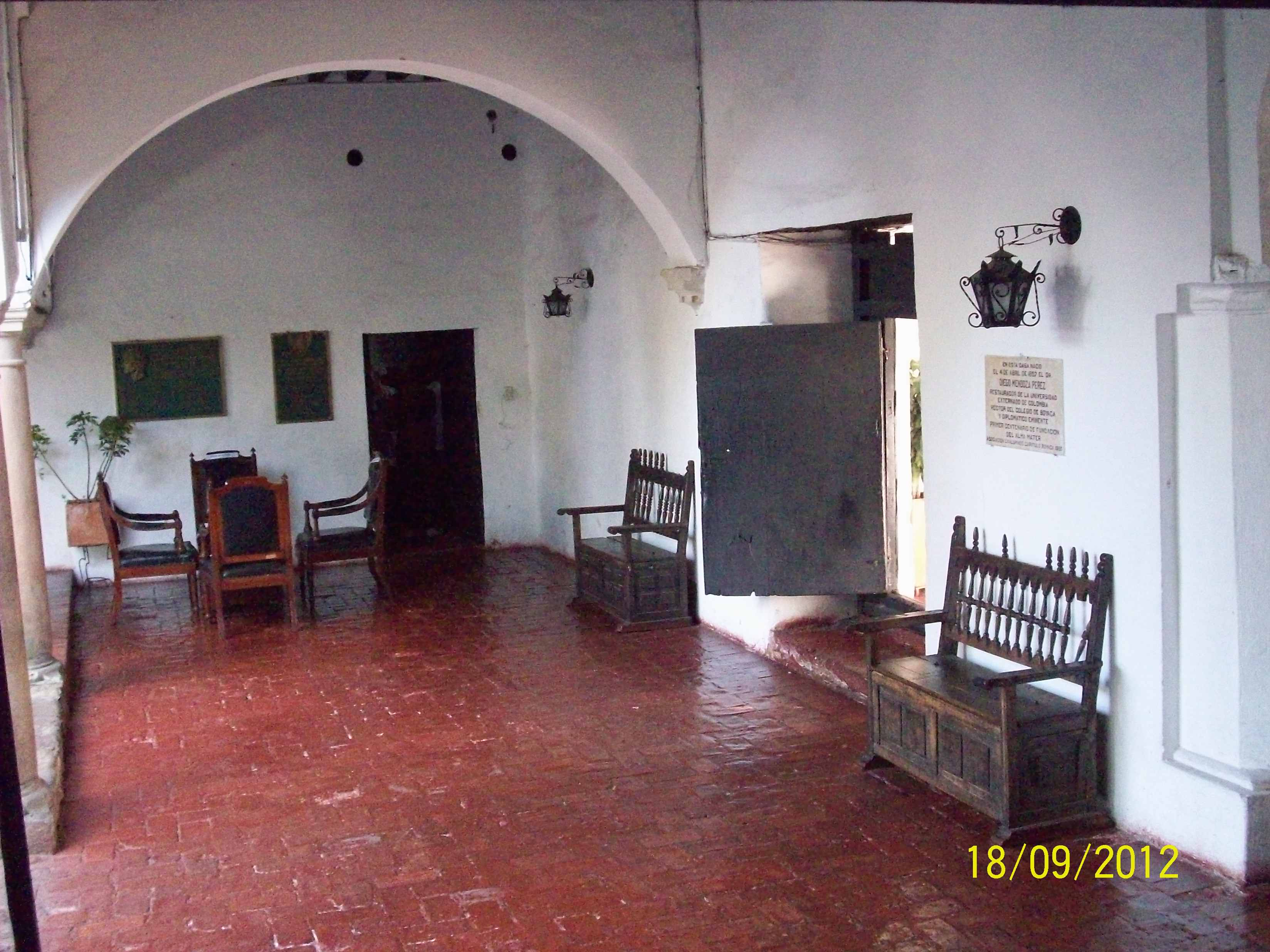
Casa

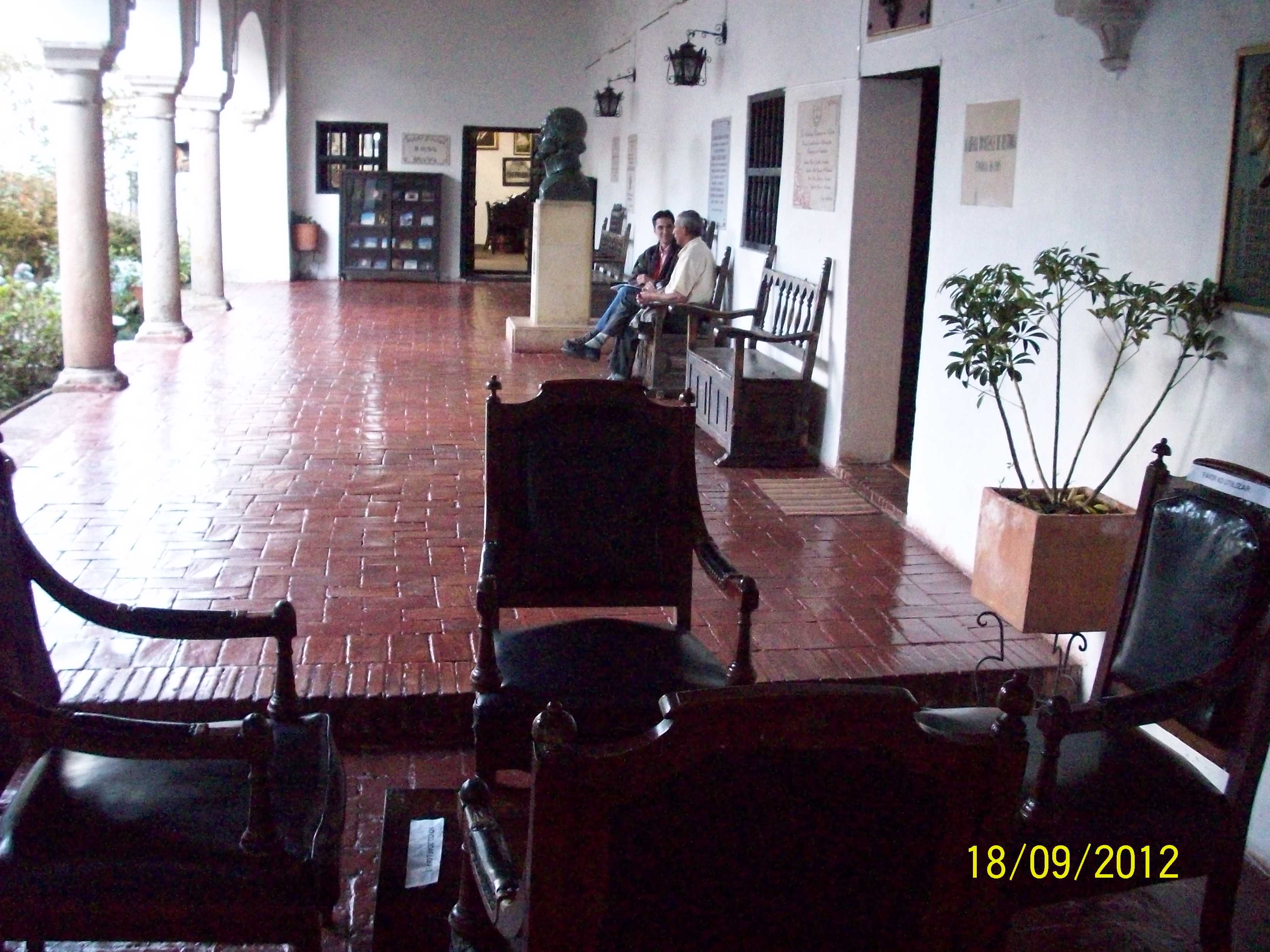
Casa

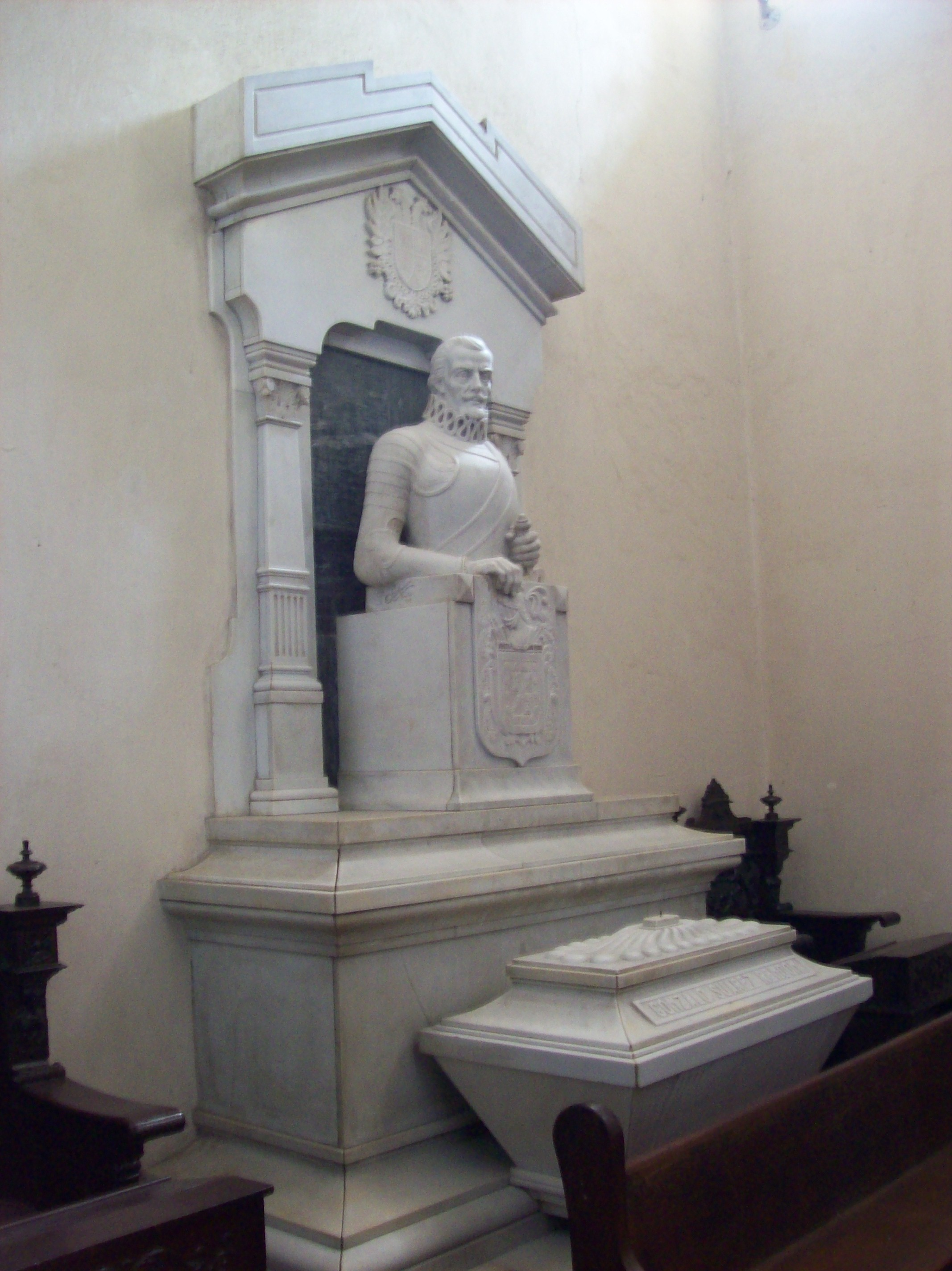
Tomb of Suárez in the cathedral of Tunja

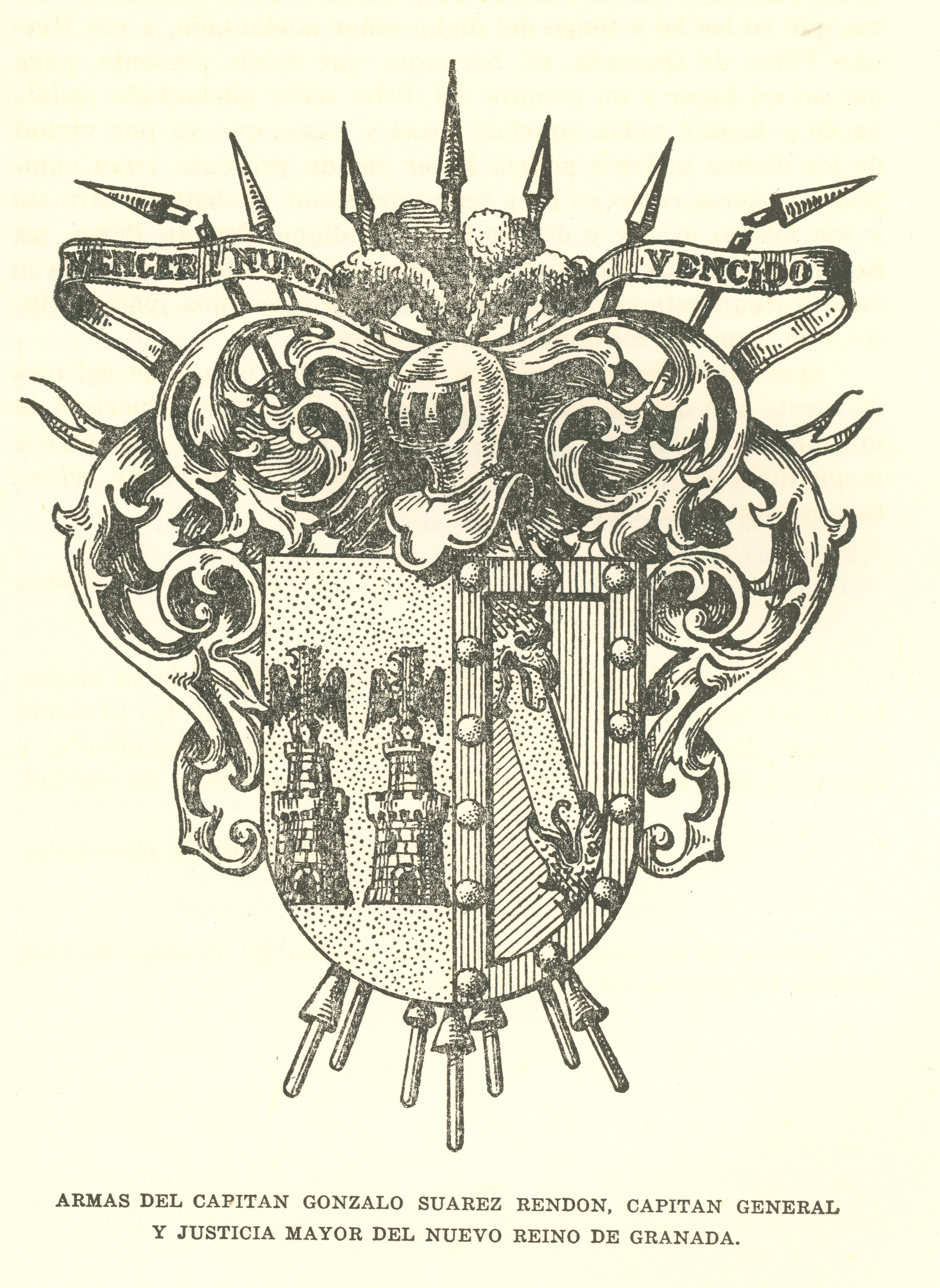
Coat of arms

== See also ==
- List of conquistadors in Colombia
- Spanish conquest of the Muisca
- El Dorado
- Tunja, Hernán Pérez de Quesada
- Gonzalo Jiménez de Quesada

== Bibliography ==
- Rodríguez Freyle, Juan; Achury Valenzuela, Darío (1979) [1859 (1638)], El Carnero – Conquista i descubrimiento del nuevo reino de Granada de las Indias Occidentales del mar oceano, i fundacion de la ciudad de Santa Fe de Bogota (PDF) (in Spanish), Fundacion Biblioteca Ayacuch, pp. 1–598
- "Epítome de la conquista del Nuevo Reino de Granada", Boletín Cultural y Bibliográfico, 16 (3), Banco de la República: 81–97, 1979 [1889 (1539)]
