= El Carnero =

Spanish language colonial chronicle

El Carnero - Conquista y descubrimiento del Nuevo Reino de Granada de las Indias Occidentales del mar océano, y fundación de la ciudad de Santafé de Bogotá
- Author: Juan Rodríguez Freyle
- Language: Spanish
- Subject: Spanish conquest of the Muisca; Conquistadors in Colombia; History of Colombia
- Genre: Semi-fiction
- Set in: New Kingdom of Granada
- Published: 1859
- Publication date: 1638
- Publication place: Colombia
- Pages: 516
- Website: El Carnero (1979 edition)

El Carnero (English: The Sheep) is the colloquial name of a Spanish language colonial chronicle whose title was Conquista y descubrimiento del Nuevo Reino de Granada de las Indias Occidentales del mar océano, y fundacion de la ciudad de Santafé de Bogotá, ... [also known as El Carnero de Bogotá] (English: Conquest and discovery of the New Kingdom of Granada of the West Indies sea, and foundation of the city of Holy Faith of Bogota). It is a chronicle of history and customs written in 1636-1638 (but not published until 1859) by Bogota-born Juan Rodríguez Freyle. (Note: Surname also spelled Freile and Fresle)

== Contents ==
El Carnero tells the story of the Spanish conquest of the Muisca; the early exploration of northern South America and the establishment of the New Kingdom of Granada, currently Colombia and parts of Venezuela, and the foundation and first century of the city of Bogotá. Bogotá was the first city of the kingdom to have an established royal audience and a chancellery. It also describes the indigenous peoples that inhabited the region during the conquest, the civil wars between them, and their customs and culture. It details the origin of the myth of El Dorado, the "Lost City of Gold", depicted in the Muisca raft; the initiation ritual of the zipa of the Muisca Confederation.

The chronicle is intended to be historical, but includes also several fictional elements through short stories. It is generally stated that these short stories are of great importance in the Hispano-American literature movement. El Carnero is regarded as the most important source for the historical events in the early colonial times of what later would become Colombia; the Spanish conquest of the Muisca and other Colombian conquests. Researcher Carlos Rey Pereira published his PhD in 2000 about the work, where he assessed the validity of the events described as a mixture of common opinions and rumours. Rodríguez Freyle filled the gaps between two other early Spanish chroniclers: Pedro Simón and Juan de Castellanos. Other critical reviews of the book mention the viewpoint of the writer; child of an encomendero and conquistador.

== See also ==
- List of conquistadors in Colombia
- Spanish conquest of the Muisca
- Indigenous peoples in Colombia
- Colombian literature, history of Colombia, history of Bogotá

== El Carnero ==
- Rodríguez Freyle, Juan; Achury Valenzuela, Darío (1979) [1859 (1638)], El Carnero - Conquista i descubrimiento del nuevo reino de Granada de las Indias Occidentales del mar oceano, i fundacion de la ciudad de Santa Fe de Bogota (PDF) (in Spanish), Fundacion Biblioteca Ayacuch, pp. 1–598, archived from the original (PDF) on 2020-08-07

== Bibliography ==
- Bost, David (1990), Historians of the colonial period: 1620-1700, Cambridge University Press, pp. 143–171, ISBN 978-0-521-34069-4
- Rey Pereira, Carlos (2000), Discurso histórico y discurso literario. El caso de El Carnero - Historical and literary discourse. The case of El Carnero (PhD) (PhD) (in Spanish), Universidad Autónoma de Madrid, pp. 1–615
- Rodríguez Ruiz, Jaime Alejandro, Novela colombiana - elementos novelescos en la Crónica: El Carnero

== Other works about the conquests ==
- "Epítome de la conquista del Nuevo Reino de Granada", Boletín Cultural y Bibliográfico, 16 (3): 81–97, 1979 [1888 (1539)]
- Jiménez de Quesada, Gonzalo (1576), Memoria de los descubridores, que entraron conmigo a descubrir y conquistar el Reino de Granada (in Spanish)
- De Castellanos, Juan (1857) [1589], Elegías de varones ilustres de Indias (in Spanish), pp. 1–567
- Simón, Pedro (1892) [1626], Noticias historiales de las conquistas de Tierra Firme en las Indias occidentales (1882-92) vol.1-5 (in Spanish)
- Fernández de Piedrahita, Lucas (1688), Historia general de las conquistas del Nuevo Reino de Granada (in Spanish)
- Acosta, Joaquín (1848), Compendio histórico del descubrimiento y colonización de la Nueva Granada en el siglo décimo sexto - Historical overview of discovery and colonization of New Granada in the sixteenth century, Paris: Beau Press, pp. 1–460, OCLC 23030434
