= Pedro de Ursúa =

Spanish conquistador

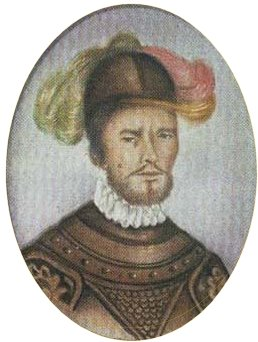
- Pedro de Ursúa
- Born: 1526; Baztan, Navarra
- Died: January 1, 1561 (aged 34–35); Amazon River, South America
- Cause of death: Murder
- Occupation: Conquistador
- Years active: 1545–1561
- Employer: Spanish Crown
- Known for: Co-founder of Pamplona; Failed conquest of the Muzo; Quest for El Dorado

Pedro de Ursúa (1526 – January 1, 1561) was a Spanish conquistador from Baztan in Navarre. He is best known for his final trip with Lope de Aguirre in search for El Dorado, where he was assassinated in a plot by a fellow officer.

He was born in Arizkun, Baztan, to a Beaumont family who supported the Spanish occupation of Navarre, benefiting directly from the Navarrese loyalist defeat at Amaiur in July 1522.

In Panama, Ursúa subdued a Cimarron (ex-slave) revolt by tricking Cimarron leader Bayano into coming unprepared to negotiate a truce. He then captured Bayano and sent him back to King Philip II of Spain. Together with Ortún Velázquez de Velasco, Pedro de Ursúa founded the city of Pamplona, New Kingdom of Granada, on November 1, 1549.

Ursúa later searched the Amazon region for El Dorado with Lope de Aguirre. When Ursúa would not allow Aguirre's mistress on the expedition, Aguirre conspired with another officer, Fernando de Guzmán, to use this rejection as a pretext to start a riot in which they assassinated Ursúa and seized power.

== Pedro de Ursúa in fiction ==
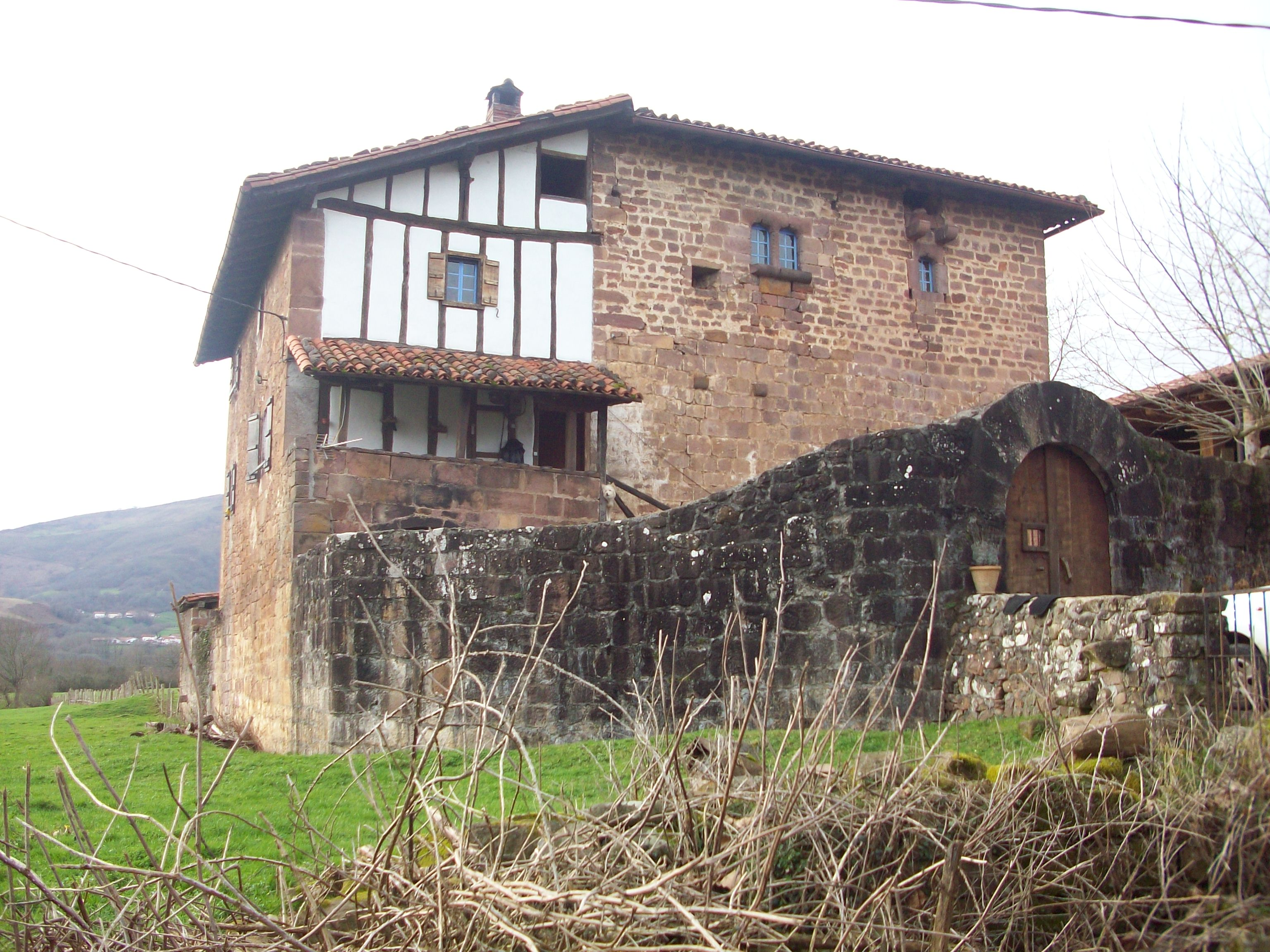
Former tower house of the Ursúa in Arizkun, Navarre

Ursúa and Aguirre's search for El Dorado is the subject of Robert Southey's book The Expedition of Orsua; and the Crimes of Aguirre (1821), The novel Ursúa (2005) by William Ospina also provides details about the life of Ursúa and a general account of the events happening in the New World during the mid 16th century.

A fictional version of Ursúa and Aguirre's story is depicted in the Werner Herzog film, Aguirre, der Zorn Gottes (1972) and in the Carlos Saura film El Dorado (1988).

== See also ==
- List of conquistadors in Colombia
- Muzo
