= Lope de Aguirre =

Basque Spanish conquistador (1510–1561)

- Pronunciation: ˈlope ðe aˈɣire
- Born: 8 November 1510; Oñati, Gipuzkoa, Crown of Castile
- Died: 27 October 1561 (aged 50); Barquisimeto, Province of Caracas
- Other names: The Wrath of God, The Wanderer, El Tirano, Prince of Liberty, Madman of Oñate
- Occupations: conquistador, rebel
- Known for: 1560–1561 expedition for El Dorado; Omagua under Pedro de Ursúa

Lope de Aguirre (8 November 1510 – 27 October 1561) was a Basque Spanish conquistador who was active in South America. Nicknamed El Loco ("the Madman"), he styled himself "Wrath of God." Aguirre is best known for his final expedition down the Amazon River in search of the mythical golden kingdom of El Dorado and Omagua.

In 1561, Aguirre led a mutiny against the expedition's commander, Pedro de Ursúa, and declared his intent to return to Peru and overthrow Spain's colonial government. He drafted a letter that defied the Castilian monarch, King Philip II, by renouncing his Spanish vassalage and declared war upon the Habsburg monarch. Aguirre's expedition ended with his death by his own men upon confronting Royalist forces in present-day Venezuela. In the years since then he has been treated by historians as a symbol of cruelty and treachery in the early history of colonial Spanish America, and has become an antihero in literature, cinema and other arts.

== In Spain ==
Aguirre was born around 1510 in the Araotz Valley, a valley and hamlet belonging to Oñati, close to Arantzazu in the province of Gipuzkoa, or in Aramaio, both in the Southern Basque Country of northern Spain. He was the son of a nobleman, possibly from a family of court clerks. Aguirre was in his twenties and living in Seville when Hernando Pizarro returned from Peru and brought back the treasures of the Incas, inspiring Aguirre to follow in his footsteps. In the early 1530s, Aguirre traveled to the Americas under the sponsorship of Viceroy Antonio de Mendoza, arriving in Cartagena.

== In the New World ==
Aguirre probably enlisted in an expedition of 250 men chosen to serve under the command of Rodrigo Duran. He arrived in Peru in 1536 or 1537. Aguirre got work breaking stallions in Cuzco, the capital of Nuevo Toledo, and was appointed regidor (alderman) of the city. As a conquistador, he soon became infamous for his violence, cruelty, and sedition against the Crown.

In 1544, Aguirre was at the side of Peru's first viceroy, Blasco Núñez Vela, who had arrived from Spain with orders to implement the New Laws, suppress the Encomiendas, and liberate the natives from slavery. Many of the conquistadors refused to implement these laws, which prohibited them from exploiting the Indians. Aguirre took part in the plot with Melchor Verdugo to free the viceroy, who had been imprisoned on the island of San Lorenzo, and turned against Gonzalo Pizarro, the leader of the anti-viceroy/New Laws faction.

After the failed attempt, they escaped from Lima to Cajamarca, and started to gather men to help the viceroy. In the meantime, thanks to the oidor Alvarez, the viceroy had escaped to Tumbes and gathered a small military force in the belief that all the country would rise up to defend the Crown under the royal flag. The viceroy's resistance to Pizarro and his deputy Francisco de Carvajal, the infamous "el demonio de los Andes" ("demon of the Andes") lasted for two years until he was defeated in Añaquito on 18 January 1546.

Aguirre and Melchor Verdugo had gone to Nicaragua, sailing to Trujillo with 33 men. Verdugo conferred captain's rank on Rodrigo de Esquivel and Nuño de Guzmán, sergeant major rank on Aguirre and contador status on the cleric Alonso de Henao, who later participated in the expedition of Pedro de Ursúa to Omagua and El Dorado. In 1551, Aguirre returned to Potosí, then still part of Peru and now part of Bolivia.

The judge, Francisco de Esquivel, arrested him and charged him with an infraction of the laws protecting the Indians. The judge discounted Aguirre's justifications and his claims of belonging to the Spanish gentry and sentenced him to a public flogging. His pride wounded, Aguirre waited for the end of the judge's mandate to avenge his honor. Fearing Aguirre's vengeance, the judge fled, changing his residence constantly.

Aguirre pursued Esquivel to Lima, Quito and then to Cuzco, missing him in all three places. For three years he trailed Esquivel on foot and without shoes, his soldiers following this obstinate pursuit with interest. Aguirre found him in Cuzco, taking a nap in the library of his house, and wearing a coat of chain mail he always wore for fear of Aguirre. Aguirre crept up to the sleeping Esquivel and stabbed him twice with a dagger. When the mail stopped his blows to the former magistrate's body, he stabbed him in the right temple and killed him. Protected by friends who had hidden him, Aguirre fled from Cuzco and took refuge with a relative in Huamanga.

In 1554, needing to put down the rebellion of Hernández Girón, Alonso de Alvarado secured a pardon for everyone who had been affiliated with Aguirre and enlisted in his army. Aguirre fought and was wounded by two musket shots at the Battle of Chuquingua against Girón, resulting in an incurable limp that caused his peers to ostracise him.

=== Search for El Dorado ===
Together with his daughter Elvira, Aguirre joined the 1560 expedition of Pedro de Ursúa down the Marañón and Amazon Rivers with 300 Spaniards and hundreds of natives. The actual goal of Ursúa was to send idle veterans from the Spanish conquest of the Inca Empire away, to keep them from trouble-making. A year later, Aguirre participated in the overthrow and killing of Ursúa and his successor, Fernando de Guzmán, whom he ultimately succeeded. He and his men reached the Atlantic, probably by the Orinoco River. On 23 March 1561, Aguirre urged 186 officers and soldiers to sign a statement acknowledging him as "Prince of Peru, Tierra Firme and Chile".

In 1561, he seized Isla Margarita and suppressed any opposition to his reign, killing the governor. When he crossed to the mainland in an attempt to take Panama, his open rebellion against the Spanish crown came to an end. He was surrounded at Barquisimeto, Venezuela, where he killed his daughter, Elvira, and his wife, "because someone that I loved so much should not come to be bedded by uncouth people". He was eventually captured by royalist forces and shot to death by his own soldier, Custodio Hernandez.

His body was beheaded and cut into quarters, with pieces being sent to nearby towns as a warning. According to the account of Fray Pedro Simón, the skull of Aguirre remained in the town square of Valencia at least forty years after his demise. In a post-mortem trial of residence held in El Tocuyo, Aguirre was found guilty of the crime of Lèse-majesté. In Mérida and El Tocuyo several of his soldiers were brought to trial, found guilty of the crimes committed and sentenced to death by dismemberment.

== Popular culture ==
Over the centuries, Lope de Aguirre’s legacy has been a focal point of reinterpretation to reflect shifting political and cultural contexts.

Early accounts written by members of his expedition portrayed him as a violent tyrant, while later colonial chroniclers used his story as a moral warning against rebellion. In the nineteenth century, independence movements in Latin America and Basque nationalist writers recast Aguirre as a proto-revolutionary who defied royal authority as one of Latin America's first revolutionaries. Twentieth-century scholarship begun to separate the historical figure from the legend, examining how each generation adapted his legacy to its own purposes.

Aguirre has been portrayed in film three times: by Klaus Kinski in the allegorical film Aguirre, the Wrath of God (1972), by Omero Antonutti in El Dorado (1988), and by Édgar Ramírez in Jungle Cruise (2021).

Aguirre's ill-fated voyage is the topic of Robert Southey's book The Expedition of Orsua; and the Crimes of Aguirre (1821), of Ramón J. Sender's 1968 Spanish-language novel La aventura equinoccial de Lope de Aguirre (ISBN 978-8421818404) and of Stephen Minta's 1995 book Aguirre: The Re-Creation of a Sixteenth-Century Journey Across South America (ISBN 978-0805031041), in which Minta retraces the expedition.

== Bibliography ==
- Galster, Ingrid (1996). Aguirre oder Die Willkür der Nachwelt. Die Rebellion des baskischen Konquistadors Lope de Aguirre in Historiographie und Geschichtsfiktion (1561–1992). Frankfurt am Main: Vervuert Verlag, ISBN 3-89354-075-X
- Galster, Ingrid (2011). Aguirre o La posteridad arbitraria. La rebelión del conquistador vasco Lope de Aguirre en historiografía y ficción histórica (1561-1992). Bogotá: Ed. Universidad del Rosario and Ed. Universidad Javeriana, ISBN 978-958-738-204-4 (also available as eBook).
- Martinez Tolentino, Jaime (2016). Dos cronicas desconocidas de Lope de Aguirre. Madrid: Editorial Fundamentos, 2012. ISBN 978-8424512613.
