= Zoratama =

Native Colombian lover of a conquistador

- Born: Guatavita, Muisca Confederation
- Died: 16th century Lake Guatavita, New Kingdom of Granada
- Cause of death: Drowning/suicide
- Other name: Soratama
- Known for: Lover of conquistador Lázaro Fonte
- Spouse: Lázaro Fonte
- Children: 1 son

Zoratama, also spelled as Soratama, was a Muisca woman and the lover of Spanish conquistador Lázaro Fonte. Her story reminds of the North American indigenous Pocahontas who married John Rolfe after saving the life of John Smith.

Together with Lázaro Fonte, Zoratama was forced in exile and settled in Pasca, Cundinamarca, in the south of the Muisca territory. After informing conquistador Gonzalo Jiménez de Quesada of the arrival of new conquistadors, they were taken back to the newly founded capital Bogotá of the New Kingdom of Granada.

According to legend, Zoratama committed suicide and infanticide by drowning herself and her son in sacred Lake Guatavita.

== Background ==
In the times before the Spanish conquest of present-day Colombia, the Altiplano Cundiboyacense was inhabited by the Muisca people. They were organised in a loose confederation of rulers (caciques) and had a total population according to scholars between 300,000 and two million people. The Muisca were an indigenous group of traders and farmers.

The southern part of the Muisca Confederation was ruled by the zipa, based in Bacatá, the present-day capital of Colombia Bogotá. The zipa who reigned at the arrival of the Spanish was Tisquesusa. His rule extended over the Bogotá savanna and neighbouring mountains of the Eastern Ranges with southernmost village Pasca, bordered to the south by the territories of the Sutagao people.

In Santa Marta, 1536, conquistador Gonzalo Jiménez de Quesada, triggered by the legend of El Dorado, set foot with an army of around 800 men towards the interior of Colombia. One of his captains was Lázaro Fonte.

== Biography ==
Zoratama was born in the town of Guatavita in the Muisca Confederation. She moved to the capital of the southern Muisca, Bacatá before the Spanish conquest. When the Spanish conquerors arrived in Bacatá, they found the town almost deserted as Tisquesusa, informed about the arrival of the European invaders, had fled with his guecha warriors to Nemocón. Zoratama stayed in Bacatá and was found by the troops of De Quesada. She fell in love with his captain Lázaro Fonte.

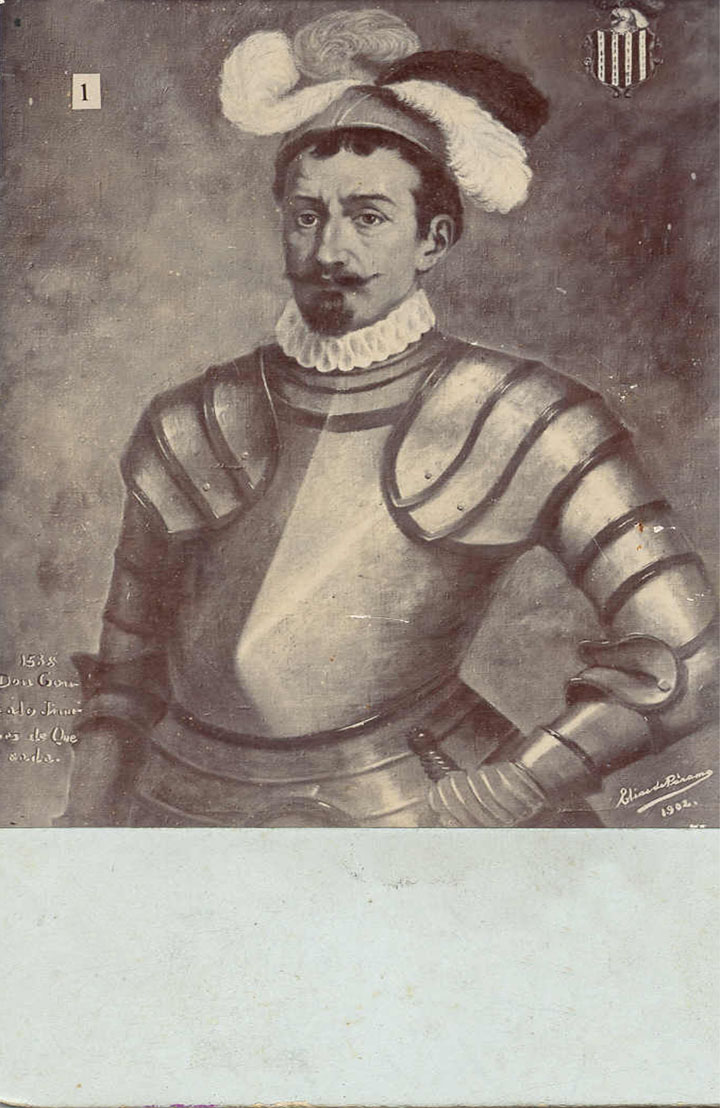
Gonzalo Jiménez de Quesada, conquistador who ordered the exile of Zoratama and her lover Lázaro Fonte

Soldiers in the army of De Quesada spread rumours about Fonte; that he had hidden emeralds from him. In an improvised lawsuit, Fonte would be convicted and punished with the death penalty, but thanks to his "lawyer"; captain Gonzalo Suárez Rendón he escaped that fate. Instead, he was forced to exile to the terrain of the Panche to the west of the Muisca territories. In January 1539, Fonte managed to change his location of exile to Pasca, Cundinamarca and took Zoratama with him.

The centre of Pasca was deserted as well, as the inhabitants feared the Spanish conquerors, and Fonte and Zoratama were left in one of the bohíos of the village. Some of the indigenous people remained in Pasca and took care of Zoratama and her lover. When in Pasca, news reached Fonte that new Spanish conquistadores were entering Muisca terrain; from later Venezuela Nicolás de Federmann and from the south Sebastián de Belalcázar.

Fonte wrote on a piece of deer skin the news and sent Zoratama back to Bacatá to inform De Quesada of the arrival of the other conquistadores. De Quesada pardoned Fonte and via Gonzalo Suárez Rendón gave him back his weapons.

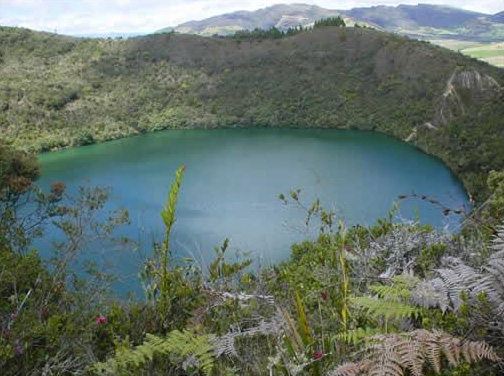
According to legend, Zoratama drowned herself and her son in sacred Lake Guatavita

Zoratama and Fonte got one son together; a mestizo child of the Spanish and indigenous. Fonte was sent on expedition to search for El Dorado in Putumayo and Amazonas in the south of present-day Colombia. He formed part of the army of Hernán Pérez de Quesada, brother of Gonzalo. Due to fever and hunger in the inhospitable jungle of the area, Fonte died.

Governor Alonso Luís de Lugo expelled Zoratama from the encomienda she was guarding and with her son she went to Cáqueza and Choachí, trying to gain income by selling firewood. Zoratama went further north to her hometown Guatavita and according to legend she drowned herself and her son in Lake Guatavita, like the cacica Guatavita had done centuries before.

== Named after Zoratama ==
- Zoratama, a rural school in Pasca
- Soratama, a neighbourhood, creek (quebrada) and quarry in the locality of Bogotá Usaquén

== See also ==
- Spanish conquest of the Muisca
- Muisca
- Muisca women

== Bibliography ==
- Ocampo López, Javier (1996). Leyendas populares colombianas [Popular Colombian legends] (in Spanish). Plaza y Janes Editores. pp. 1–384. ISBN 9789581402670.
