= Juan Rodríguez Freyle =

Colombian writer (1566-1642)

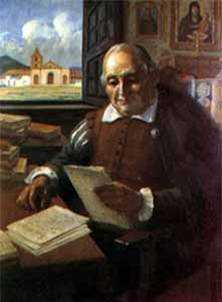
- Painting of Juan Rodríguez Freyle
- Born: April 25, 1566; Bogotá, New Kingdom of Granada
- Died: 1642 (aged 75–76); Bogotá, New Kingdom of Granada
- Spouse: Francisca Rodríguez
- Relatives: Juan Freyle (father); Catalina Rodríguez (mother)
- Writing career
- Language: Spanish
- Subjects: Spanish conquest of the Muisca; Spanish conquest of the Chibchan Nations; El Dorado
- Notable work: El Carnero - Conquista y descubrimiento del Nuevo Reino de Granada de las Indias Occidentales del Mar Océano, y Fundación de la ciudad de Santafé de Bogotá, primera de este reino donde se fundó la Real Audiencia y Cancillería, siendo la cabeza se hizo su arzobispado (1638, first published in 1859)

Juan Rodríguez Freyle (also written as Juan Rodríguez Freile), (Bogotá, New Kingdom of Granada, 25 April 1566 - Bogotá, 1642) was an early writer in the New Kingdom of Granada, the Spanish colonial territory of what today is Colombia, Ecuador, Panama and Venezuela. The son of a soldier in the army of Pedro de Ursúa, Rodríguez Freyle knew the cacique of Guatavita and the founder of Bogotá: Gonzalo Jiménez de Quesada. His major work El Carnero is a collection of stories, anecdotes and rumours about the early days of the New Kingdom of Granada and the demise of the Muisca Confederation. It is one of the most important sources for the sixteenth century Spanish period of present-day Colombia.

Juan Rodríguez Freyle was married to Francisca Rodríguez and died in Bogotá in 1642.

== Biography ==
Juan Rodríguez Freyle was born in Bogotá, the capital of the New Kingdom of Granada, as son of Juan Freyle and Catalina Rodríguez. The Freyles were originally from Alcalá de Henares, Spain and of good standing. Little is known about his life, but he didn't have a full education and sources state he learned how to read from Gonzalo García Zorro, seven times mayor of Bogotá between 1544 and 1564. (Note: Gonzalo García Zorro died in 1566, the year Rodríguez Freyle was born)

Rodríguez Freyle studied at the San Luis seminary for two years, where he was expelled for including the nickname for the archbishop Zapata as Sabata. Freyle enrolled in expeditions to submit the indigenous groups Timaná (Huila) and Pijao, the latter under command of president Juan de Borja. He got to know conquistador, founder and first mayor of Bogotá Gonzalo Jiménez de Quesada who died in 1579, and the cacique of Guatavita. Later, he remained six years in Spain as secretary of oidor Alonso Pérez Salazar. During his time in Spain from 1585 to 1591, he witnessed the attack on Cádiz by the pirate Francis Drake in 1587. Upon the death of Pérez Salazar, Rodríguez Freyle found himself in economical problems and in a country far away from his birth nation.

He returned to the New Kingdom of Granada and settled for a while in Cartagena de Indias. After his time in Cartagena, Juan Rodríguez Freyle traveled along the Magdalena River back to his birthplace and dedicated himself to agriculture in Guatavita, Cundinamarca. Back in Bogotá, in 1603 or 1604 he married Francisca Rodríguez and as it seems worked in the office for the collection of taxes. In his free time, he started to write. Of Rodríguez Freyle is said that he was an educated man and fond of literature.

== El Carnero ==
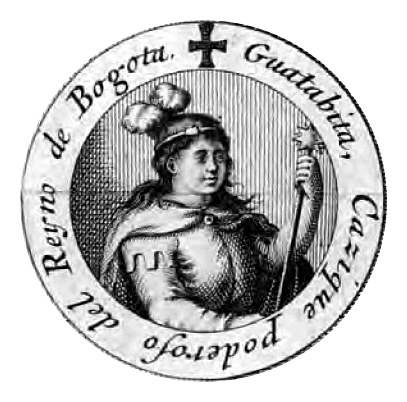
The cacique of Guatavita was known to Juan Rodríguez Freyle, who settled in Guasca, Cundinamarca, close to sacred Lake Guatavita, the site of the legend of El Dorado

In the last years of his life, between 1636 and 1638, Rodríguez Freyle wrote his magnum opus: El Carnero - Conquista y descubrimiento del Nuevo Reino de Granada de las Indias Occidentales del Mar Océano, y Fundación de la ciudad de Santafé de Bogotá, primera de este reino donde se fundó la Real Audiencia y Cancillería, siendo la cabeza se hizo su arzobispado, about the first conquistadors in Colombia, among which his father, Juan Freyle, soldier under Pedro de Ursúa. The work is one of the most extensive sources about the Spanish conquest of the Muisca. Rodríguez Freyle wrote this book based on his friendship with the cacique of Guatavita, one of the major rulers of the Muisca Confederation. Juan Rodríguez Freyle lived in Guasca, Cundinamarca, close to sacred Lake Guatavita. El Carnero was mentioned in the historical literature for the first time in 1785 and not fully published until 1859.

El Carnero ("The Sheep") is regarded as the most important source for the historical events in the early colonial times of what later would become Colombia. Researcher Carlos Rey Pereira published his PhD in 2000 about the work, where he assessed the validity of the events described as a mixture of common opinions and rumours. Rodríguez Freyle filled the gaps between two other early Spanish chroniclers: Pedro Simón and Juan de Castellanos. Other critical reviews of the book mention the viewpoint of the writer; child of an encomendero and conquistador. Rey Pereira quotes scholar David Bost:

"Modern scholarship has shown that such a confluence of what we now term history and fiction was common during this period. Historical writers frequently relied upon recourses from literary models to invest their accounts with a more expressive language. There was often no clear distinction between the two forms of writing with regard to truth or reliability; it was not uncommon for historians like Rodríguez Freyle or Pedro Simón to create portraitures and characterizations with little or no textual evidence. Historians were free to speculate about people and occurrences; their narratives thus reflect frequent turns toward an imaginative, inventive depiction of the American scene."

== See also ==
- List of Muisca scholars
- Spanish conquest of the Muisca
- Spanish conquest of the Chibchan Nations
- El Carnero, Gonzalo Jiménez de Quesada

== Bibliography ==
- Bost, David (1990), Historians of the colonial period: 1620-1700, Cambridge University Press, pp. 143–171, ISBN 978-0-521-34069-4
- Rey Pereira, Carlos (2000), Discurso histórico y discurso literario. El caso de El Carnero - Historical and literary discourse. The case of El Carnero (PhD) (PhD) (in Spanish), Universidad Autónoma de Madrid, pp. 1–615
- Rodríguez Freyle, Juan; Achury Valenzuela, Darío (1979) [1859 (1638)], El Carnero - Conquista i descubrimiento del nuevo reino de Granada de las Indias Occidentales del mar oceano, i fundacion de la ciudad de Santa Fe de Bogota (PDF) (in Spanish), Fundacion Biblioteca Ayacuch, pp. 1–598
