= Güicán =

Municipality in the department of Boyacá, Colombia

- Municipality and town
- Guicán de la Sierra
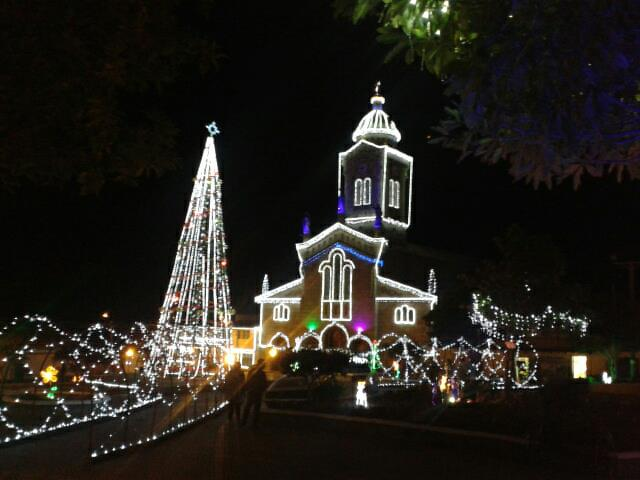

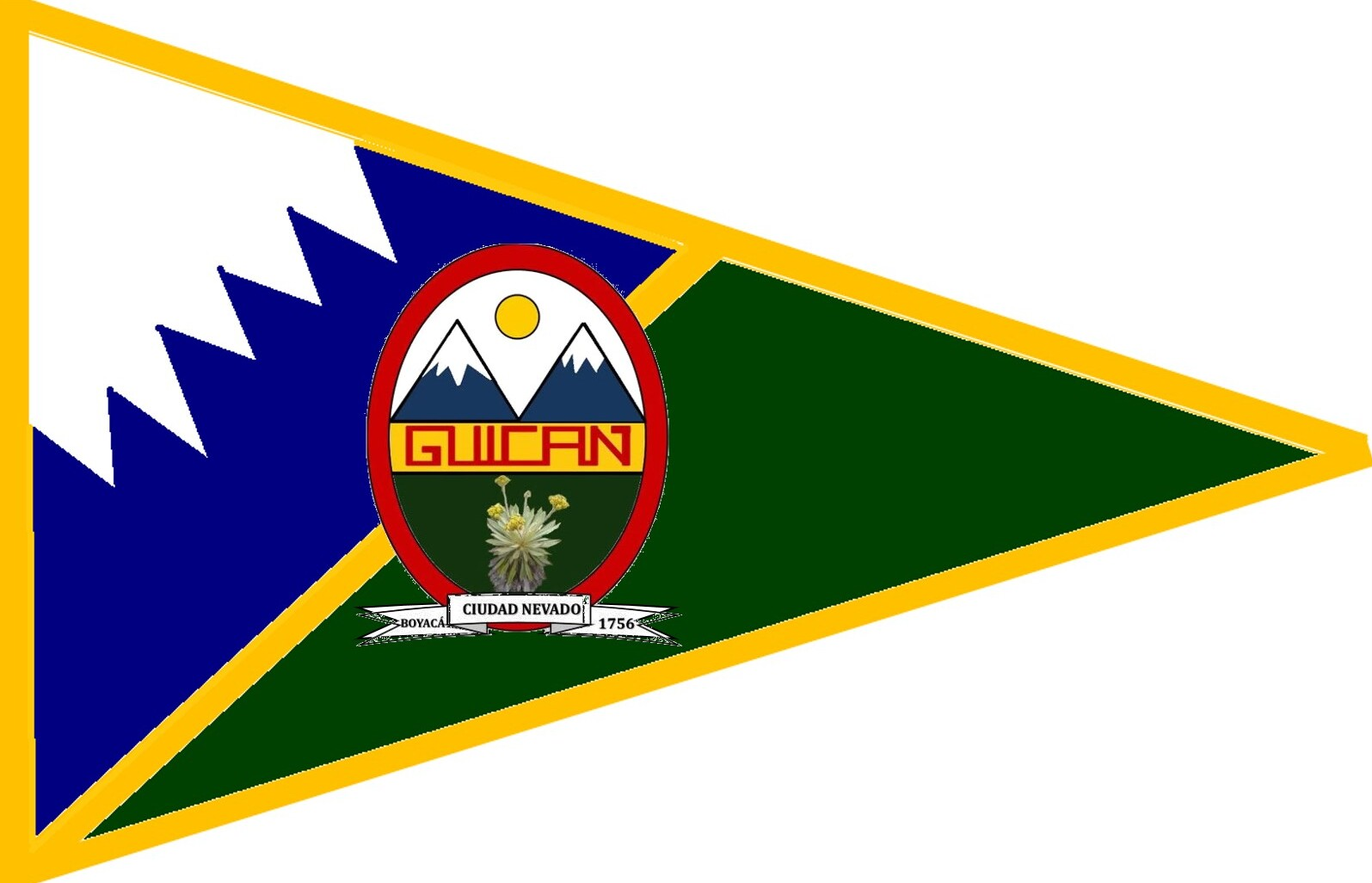
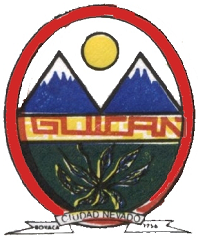
- Flag Seal

- Location of the municipality and town of Güicán in the Boyacá Department of Colombia.

- Location in Colombia
- Coordinates: 06°27′45″N 72°24′43″W
- Country: Colombia
- Department: Boyacá
- Province: Gutiérrez
- Established: February 26, 1756

Government
  - Mayor: Juan de Jesús Estupiñan Pérez (2020-2023)

Area
  - Total: 934.04 km^{2} (360.63 sq mi)
- Elevation: 3,492 m (11,457 ft)

Population (2020)
  - Total: 6,426
  - Density: 6.880/km^{2} (17.82/sq mi)
- Time zone: UTC-5 (COT)
- Postal code: 151440

Güicán de la Sierra, also known as Nuestra Señora de la Candelaria de Güicán, is a town and municipality in the Colombian Department of Boyacá. It is close to the national natural park El Cocuy National Park. As of the year 2020, it has a total population of 6,426.

== Etymology ==
The municipality was named after Güicán tribe, an indigenous people who inhabited this region and is related to the U'wa people. The name Güicán means "in the fence of the wife" in the indigenous language.

== History ==
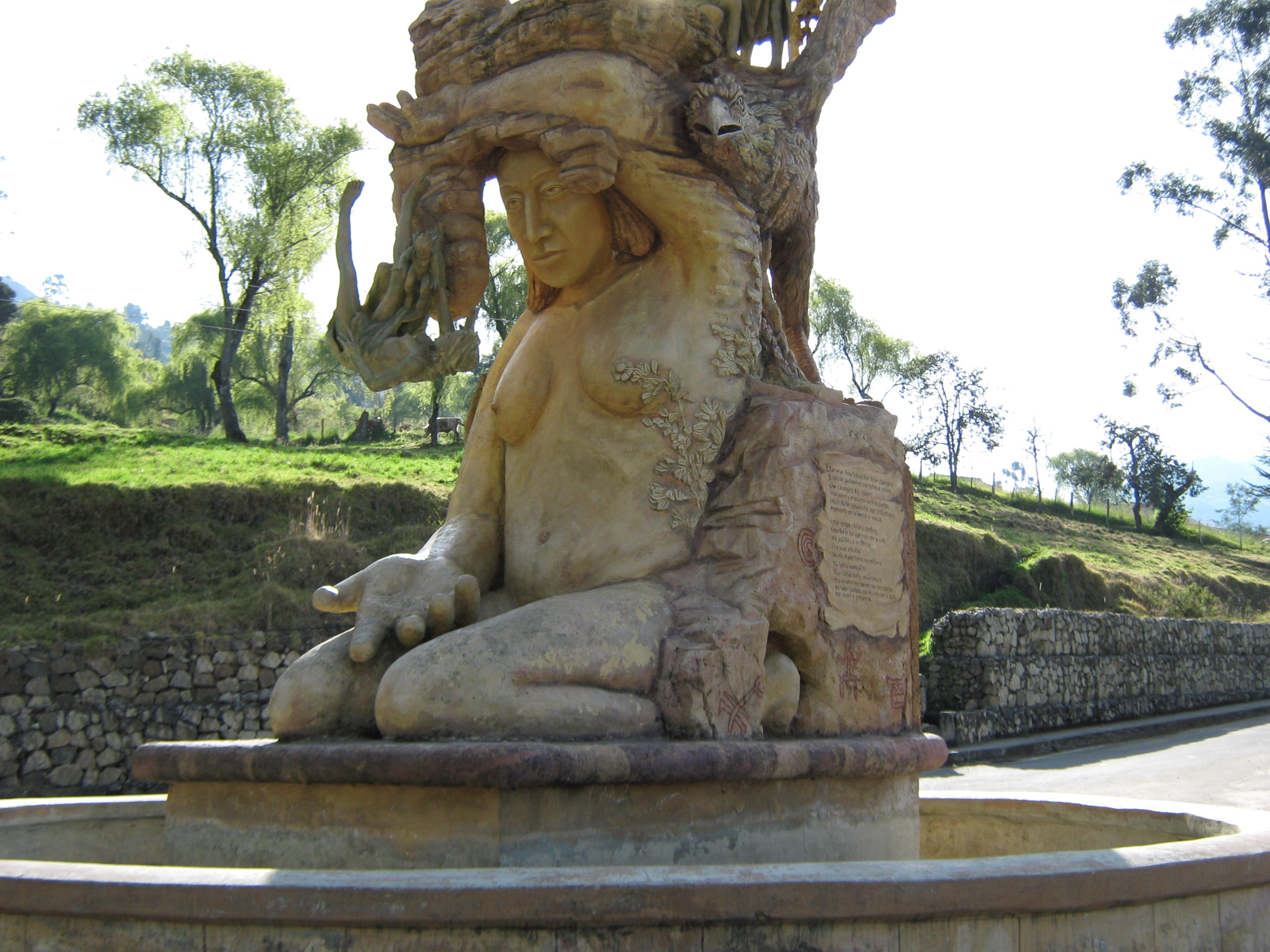
Monument to the indigenous dignity of Güicán

The conquistador of this territory was Hernán Pérez de Quesada, who arrived with his troops in search of gold. The aborigines withdrew behind the Sierra Nevada to escape from the Spanish. The municipality was founded by a Jesuit friar Miguel Blasco on February 26, 1756.

== Geography ==
The municipality borders Chiscas and Cubará on the north, Fortul and Saravena on the east, Tame and El Cocuy on the south, as well as Panqueba and El Espino on the west. Its average elevation is at 3,492 meters above the sea level.

== Climate ==
Güicán has a Tundra Climate (ET). It receives the most rainfall in April, with 244 mm of average precipitation; and the least in January, with 83 mm of average precipitation.

Climate data for Güicán, elevation 2,963 m (9,721 ft), (1981–2010)
Month	Jan	Feb	Mar	Apr	May	Jun	Jul	Aug	Sep	Oct	Nov	Dec	Year
Mean daily maximum °C (°F)	20.1 (68.2)	20.6 (69.1)	20.2 (68.4)	18.8 (65.8)	18.4 (65.1)	18.3 (64.9)	18.1 (64.6)	18.5 (65.3)	18.7 (65.7)	18.5 (65.3)	18.4 (65.1)	19.2 (66.6)	18.9 (66.0)
Daily mean °C (°F)	13.5 (56.3)	13.6 (56.5)	13.7 (56.7)	13.4 (56.1)	13.2 (55.8)	13.0 (55.4)	12.9 (55.2)	12.9 (55.2)	12.9 (55.2)	12.9 (55.2)	12.9 (55.2)	13.2 (55.8)	13.2 (55.8)
Mean daily minimum °C (°F)	7.3 (45.1)	7.6 (45.7)	8.1 (46.6)	8.8 (47.8)	9.1 (48.4)	8.8 (47.8)	8.3 (46.9)	8.1 (46.6)	8.2 (46.8)	8.3 (46.9)	8.2 (46.8)	7.6 (45.7)	8.2 (46.8)
Average precipitation mm (inches)	28.0 (1.10)	41.9 (1.65)	83.9 (3.30)	119.2 (4.69)	138.8 (5.46)	91.5 (3.60)	82.1 (3.23)	91.9 (3.62)	103.8 (4.09)	135.5 (5.33)	103.2 (4.06)	51.2 (2.02)	1,032.7 (40.66)
Average precipitation days (≥ 1.0 mm)	8	10	15	19	23	22	22	21	20	22	19	13	206
Average relative humidity (%)	81	80	82	85	87	87	86	85	85	85	86	83	84
Source: Instituto de Hidrologia Meteorologia y Estudios Ambientales

Climate data for Güicán (Sierra Nevada Cocuy), elevation 3,716 m (12,192 ft), (1981–2010)
Month	Jan	Feb	Mar	Apr	May	Jun	Jul	Aug	Sep	Oct	Nov	Dec	Year
Mean daily maximum °C (°F)	13.2 (55.8)	12.4 (54.3)	12.2 (54.0)	11.4 (52.5)	11.1 (52.0)	11.2 (52.2)	11.2 (52.2)	11.3 (52.3)	11.3 (52.3)	11.2 (52.2)	11.4 (52.5)	12.0 (53.6)	11.7 (53.1)
Daily mean °C (°F)	7.2 (45.0)	6.9 (44.4)	7 (45)	6.8 (44.2)	6.7 (44.1)	6.7 (44.1)	6.6 (43.9)	6.6 (43.9)	6.6 (43.9)	6.5 (43.7)	6.6 (43.9)	6.9 (44.4)	6.8 (44.2)
Mean daily minimum °C (°F)	−0.5 (31.1)	−0.1 (31.8)	0.8 (33.4)	1.3 (34.3)	1.7 (35.1)	1.7 (35.1)	1.4 (34.5)	1.4 (34.5)	1.4 (34.5)	1.4 (34.5)	1.3 (34.3)	0.6 (33.1)	1.0 (33.8)
Average precipitation mm (inches)	23.4 (0.92)	38.4 (1.51)	64.6 (2.54)	120.7 (4.75)	138.4 (5.45)	98.4 (3.87)	82.5 (3.25)	90.0 (3.54)	103.8 (4.09)	128.1 (5.04)	99.6 (3.92)	53.7 (2.11)	1,031 (40.6)
Average precipitation days (≥ 1.0 mm)	6	9	11	18	23	21	20	20	20	21	18	13	193
Average relative humidity (%)	84	84	84	85	85	85	86	86	86	86	86	85	85
Mean monthly sunshine hours	220.1	183.5	164.3	108.0	96.1	117.0	145.7	139.5	111.0	105.4	129.0	186.0	1,705.6
Mean daily sunshine hours	7.1	6.5	5.3	3.6	3.1	3.9	4.7	4.5	3.7	3.4	4.3	6.0	4.7
Source: Instituto de Hidrologia Meteorologia y Estudios Ambientales

== Galleries ==
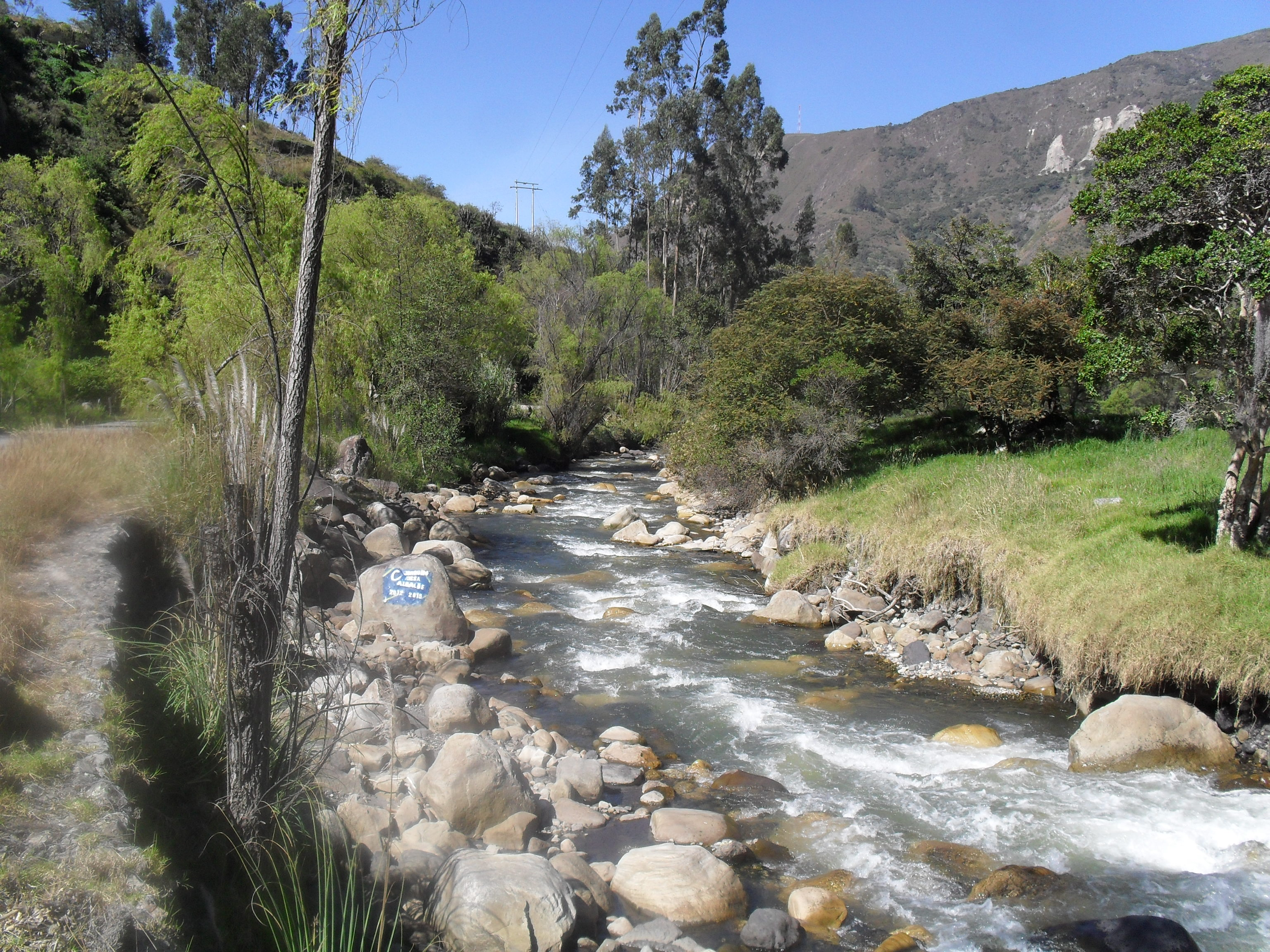
Río Cóncavo as it passes through Güicán.

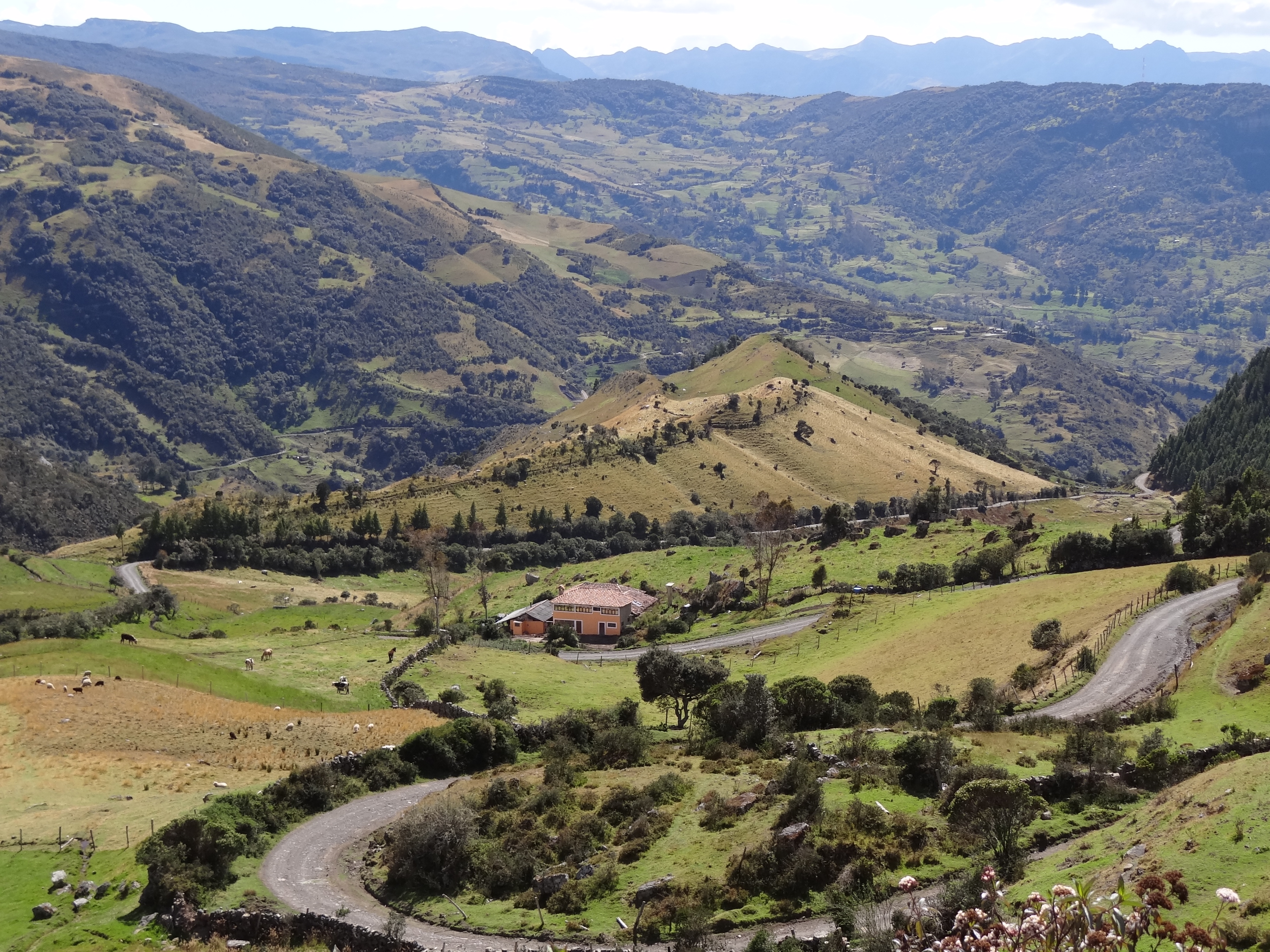
View of the rural sector of Güicán.

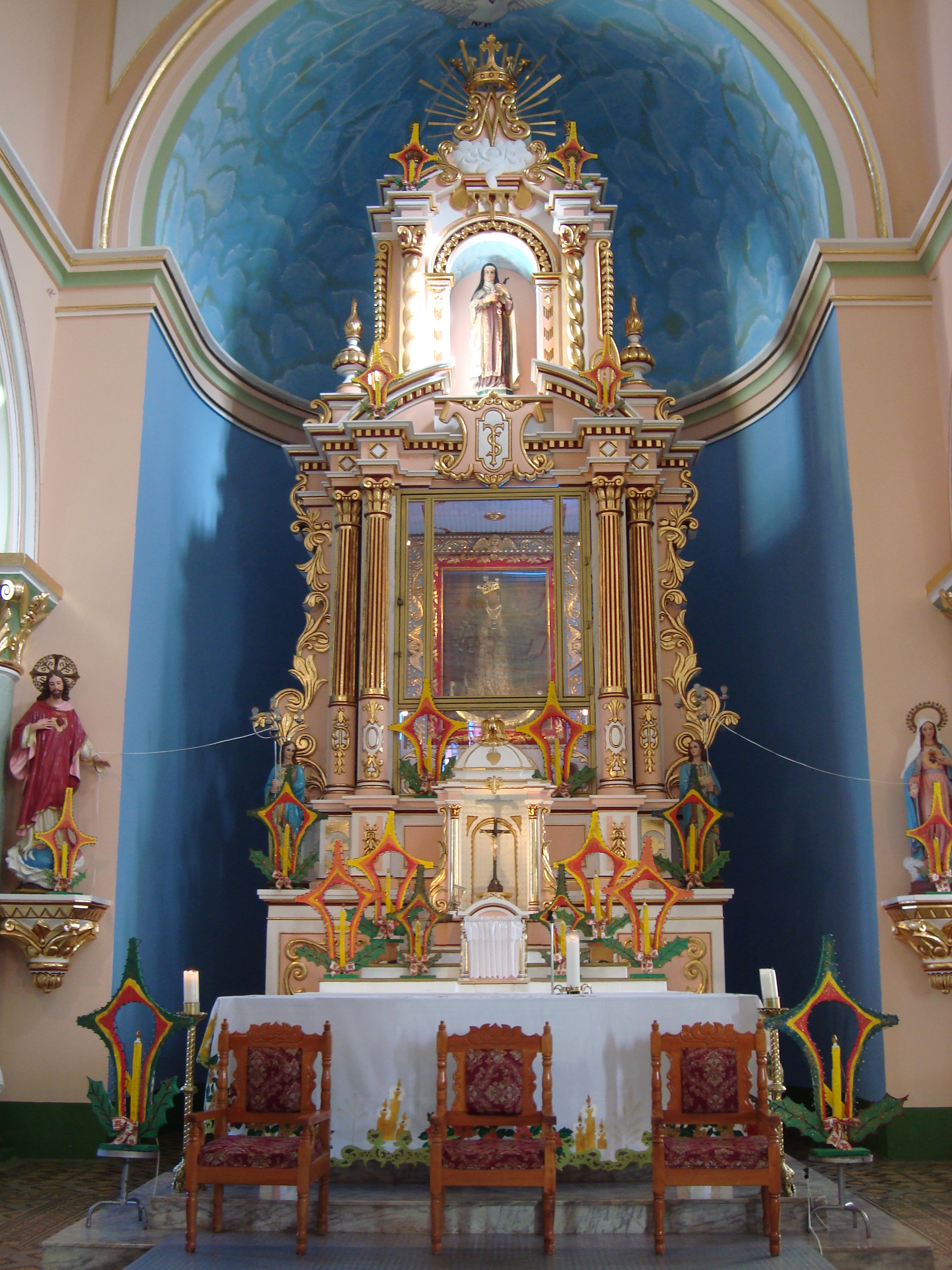
Main altar of the Sanctuary of the Morenita Virgin

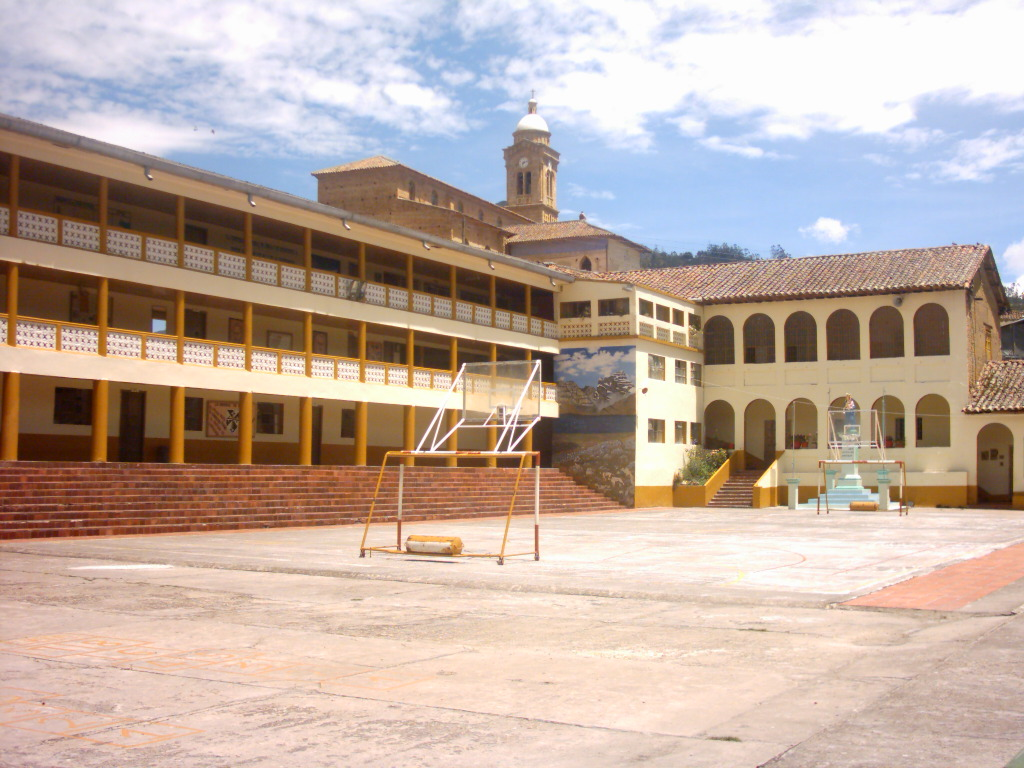
Old physical plant of the ENS Nuestra Señora del Rosario de Güicán.
