= Miguel Holguín y Figueroa =

Spanish conquistador

- Born: 1516; Cáceres, Kingdom of Spain
- Died: After 1576; Tunja, New Kingdom of Granada
- Other names: Miguel Holguín de Figueroa
- Occupation: Conquistador
- Years active: 1535-1539
- Employer: Spanish Crown
- Known for: Spanish conquest of Venezuela; Spanish conquest of the Muisca; Quest for El Dorado
- Spouses: Isabel de Cárcamo y Orozco; Isabel Maldonado de Bohórquez
- Children: 3 daughters: Inés de Cárcamo, Elvira de Holguín, María Maldonado de Holguín; 1 son: Diego Holguín de Figueroa Maldonado de Bohorques

Mayor of Tunja
- In office 1558–1558
- Preceded by: Gregorio Suárez de Deza & Pedro García Ruiz.
- Succeeded by: Diego Montañez & Pedro Vásquez de Loaiza
- In office 1564–1564
- Preceded by: Juan López
- Succeeded by: Francisco Salguero & Hernando de Rojas
- In office 1572–1572
- Preceded by: Gómez de Cifuentes & Pedro Bravo
- Succeeded by: Pedro García Ruiz & Diego de Partearroyo
- In office 1576–1576
- Preceded by: Pedro López Patiño de Haro & Juan Prieto Maldonado
- Succeeded by: Hernando Mateos & Bachiller Pedro de Valdelomar

Miguel Holguín y Figueroa, also written as Miguel Holguín de Figueroa, (1516, Cáceres, Kingdom of Spain - after 1576, Tunja, New Kingdom of Granada) was a Spanish conquistador. He took part in the expeditions of conquest of the Chitarero, Motilon, U'wa and Lache peoples led by Nikolaus Federmann. Holguín y Figueroa later settled in Tunja, where he protested the rapacious activities of Hernán Pérez de Quesada, governor of Bogotá.

Miguel Holguín y Figueroa was chronicled by Juan Rodríguez Freyle in El Carnero.

== Biography ==
Miguel Holguín y Figueroa, also written as Holguín de Figueroa, was born in 1516 in Cáceres. He married twice: to Isabel de Cárcamo y Orozco; and Isabel Maldonado de Bohórquez (or Bohórques), widow of Pedro Núñez Cabrera. With Isabel de Cárcamo y Orozco he had two daughters: Inés de Cárcamo and Elvira de Holguín; with Isabel Maldonado de Bohórquez a son and a daughter: Diego Holguín de Figueroa Maldonado de Bohorques and María Maldonado de Holguín. Miguel Holguín y Figueroa was mayor of Tunja for four terms; 1558, 1564, 1572 and 1576. He is named in texts until 1576, while his year of death in Tunja is unknown.

== See also ==
- List of conquistadors in Colombia
- Spanish conquest of the Muisca
- El Dorado
- Spanish conquest of the Chibchan Nations, Hernán Pérez de Quesada
- Gonzalo Jiménez de Quesada, Nikolaus Federmann

== Bibliography ==
- Muñoz Cárdenas, Felipe Andrés (2014), La Administración de Tunja a través del siglo XX - The Administration of Tunja through the twentieth century (PDF), Universidad Nacional de Colombia, pp. 1–163
- Rodríguez Freyle, Juan; Achury Valenzuela, Darío (1979) [1859 (1638)], El Carnero - Conquista i descubrimiento del nuevo reino de Granada de las Indias Occidentales del mar oceano, i fundacion de la ciudad de Santa Fe de Bogota (PDF) (in Spanish), Fundacion Biblioteca Ayacuch, pp. 1–598
