= Fortul =

- Municipality and town
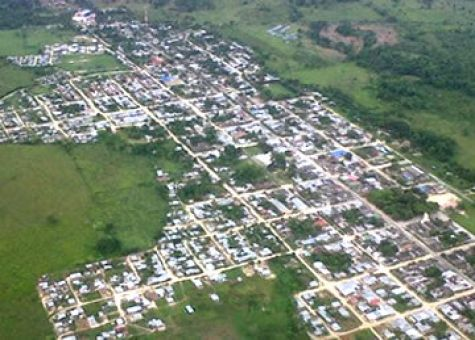
- View of Fortul

- Flag Coat of arms

- Panorama of the urban area of Fortul; Location of the municipality and town of Fortul in the Arauca Department of Colombia
- Coordinates: 6°47′35″N 71°46′17″O
- Country: Colombia
- Department: Arauca Department
- Founded: January 7, 1920

Government
  - Mayor: Lenin Pastrana Vergel

Area
  - Total: 1,125 km^{2} (434 sq mi)
- Elevation: 246 m (807 ft)

Population (Census 2018)
  - Total: 17,492
- Time zone: UTC-5 (Colombia Standard Time)
- Climate: Am

Fortul is one of the seven municipalities of the Colombian department of Arauca. It limits to the north with Saravena; to the south with Tame; to the east with Arauquita and to the west with Güicán. It was founded on January 7, 1920. According to the census conducted by the DANE in 2005, Fortul has a population of 25,379 inhabitants, of which 13,081 live in the municipal seat making it 49.5% women and 50.5% men.

== Economy ==
The economic activities in the municipality are given by the sale of basic primary services and goods, as well as by some transformation of raw materials. The town has an organized trade of goods and consumption (stores, stores, restaurants, workshops, supplies and others). Three important activities in the town are livestock, agriculture, and the production of double cream cheese by some lactic micro-enterprises. The area of direct influence of the urban area on the territory is considered approximately 30% of its territory, since the neighboring municipalities, Arauquita, Tame and Saravena, cover the demand for services and remaining goods; thus, the urban dynamics of this town is very scarce as people from rural areas go to the villages.
