= Gutiérrez Province =

Gutiérrez Province Provincia de Gutiérrez
- Province
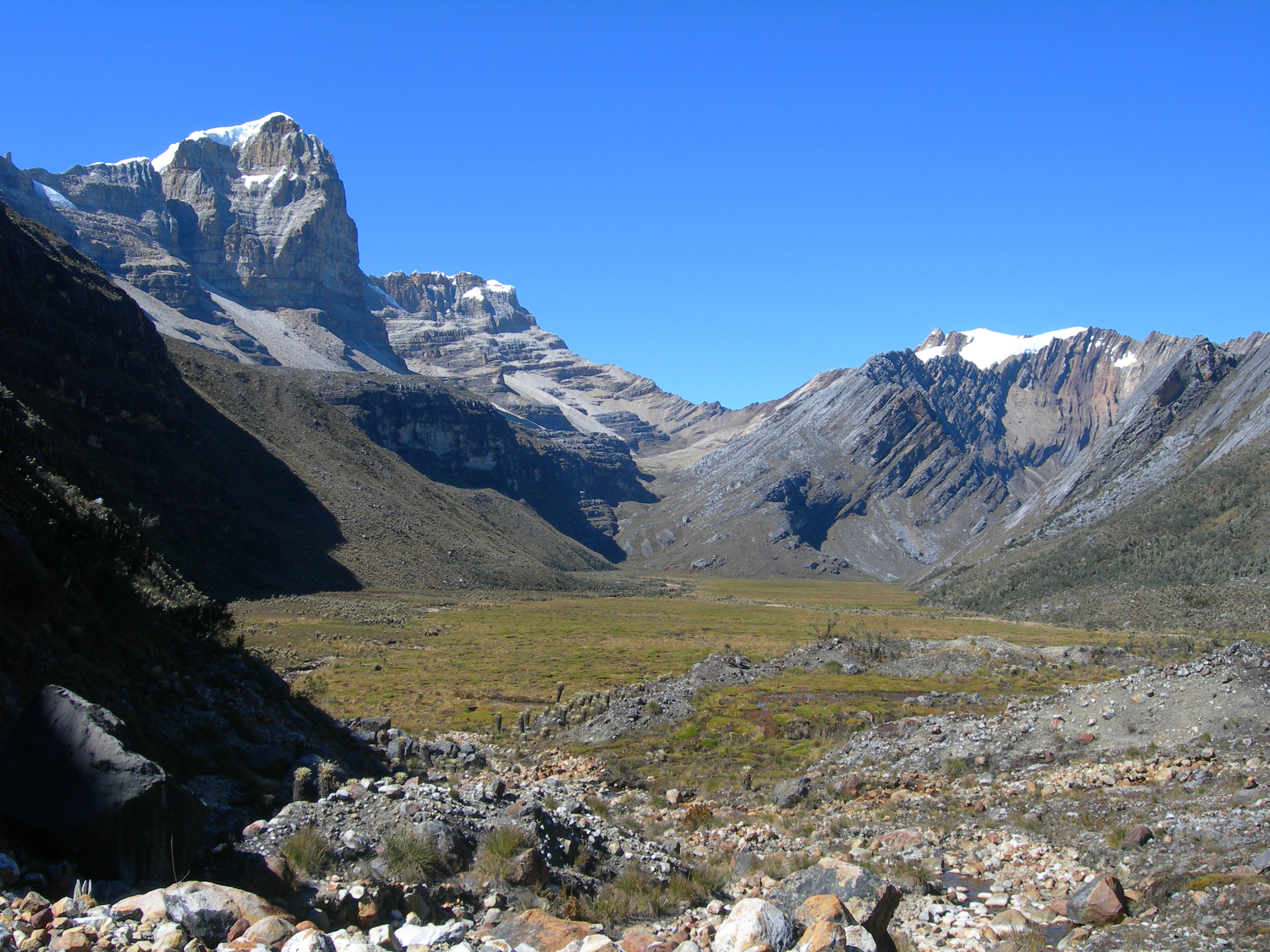
- National Natural Park El Cocuy
- Etymology: José Santos Gutiérrez
- Location of Gutiérrez Province in Colombia
- Coordinates: 6°25′00″N 72°25′00″W
- Country: Colombia
- Department: Boyacá
- Capital: El Cocuy
- Municipalities: 6
- Time zone: UTC−5 (COT)
- Indigenous groups: Lache

The Gutiérrez Province is a province of the Colombian Department of Boyacá. The province is formed by six municipalities. The province is named after Colombian president José Santos Gutiérrez. The highest mountains of the Eastern Ranges of the Colombian Andes are located in the Gutiérrez Province. The Ritacuba Blanco, with 5,410 metres (17,750 ft) the highest peak in the Eastern Ranges is the second-most prominent peak of Colombia, after the highest double mountain Pico Cristóbal Colón.

== Municipalities ==
Chiscas • El Cocuy • El Espino • Guacamayas • Güicán • Panqueba
