= Postal codes in Colombia =

Postal codes in Colombia are 6 digit numeric.

The first group of two digits are the numbers used by DANE to encode the departments.

The second group of two digits in the range of 00 to 89 encode postal zones, where 00 is used for the department capital. In the range of 90 - 99 it has another meaning.

The third group of two digits encodes up to 100 postal districts in each zone. So there can be 32 * 90 * 100 = 288,000 postal districts in the geographic defined zones in all departments combined.
