= El Espino, Boyacá =

Coordinates: 6°35′N 72°25′W

- Municipality and town
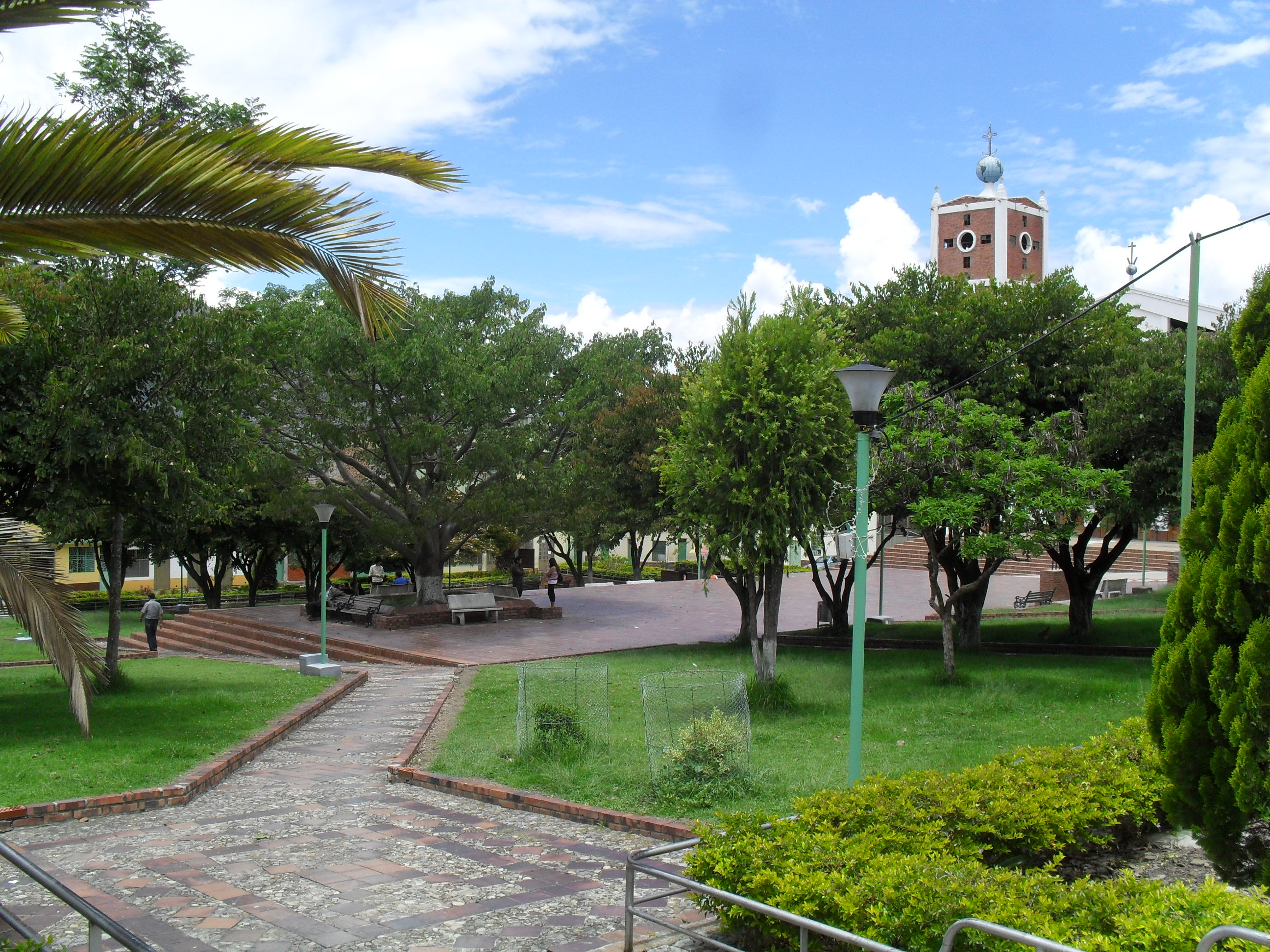

- Flag Coat of arms

- Location of the municipality and town of El Espino, Boyacá in the Boyacá Department of Colombia.
- Country: Colombia
- Department: Boyacá Department
- Province: Gutiérrez Province

Government
  - Mayor: Edberto José Jaime Cocunubo (2020-2023)
- Time zone: UTC-5 (Colombia Standard Time)

El Espino is a town and municipality in the Colombian Department of Boyacá, part of the subregion of the Gutiérrez Province.
