= Guacamayas, Boyacá =

Coordinates: 6°30′N 72°30′W

- Municipality and town
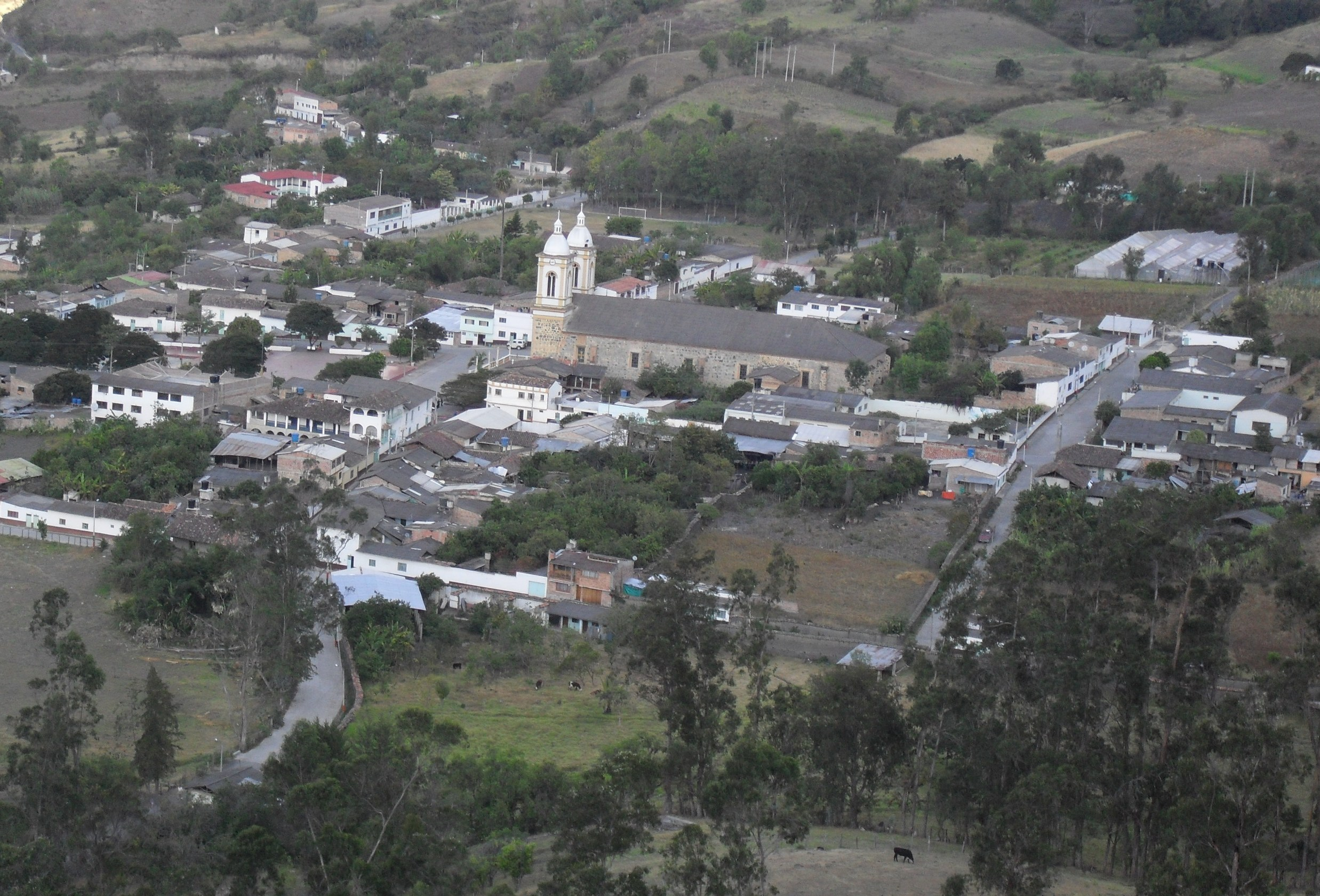

- Flag

- Location of the municipality and town of Guacamayas, Boyacá in the Boyacá Department of Colombia.
- Country: Colombia
- Department: Boyacá Department
- Province: Gutiérrez Province

Government
  - Mayor: Wilson Fernando Barón Gómez (2020-2023)
- Time zone: UTC-5 (Colombia Standard Time)

Guacamayas is a town and municipality in the Colombian Department of Boyacá, part of the subregion of the Gutiérrez Province.
