= Panqueba =

Coordinates: 6°26′N 72°28′W

- Municipality and town
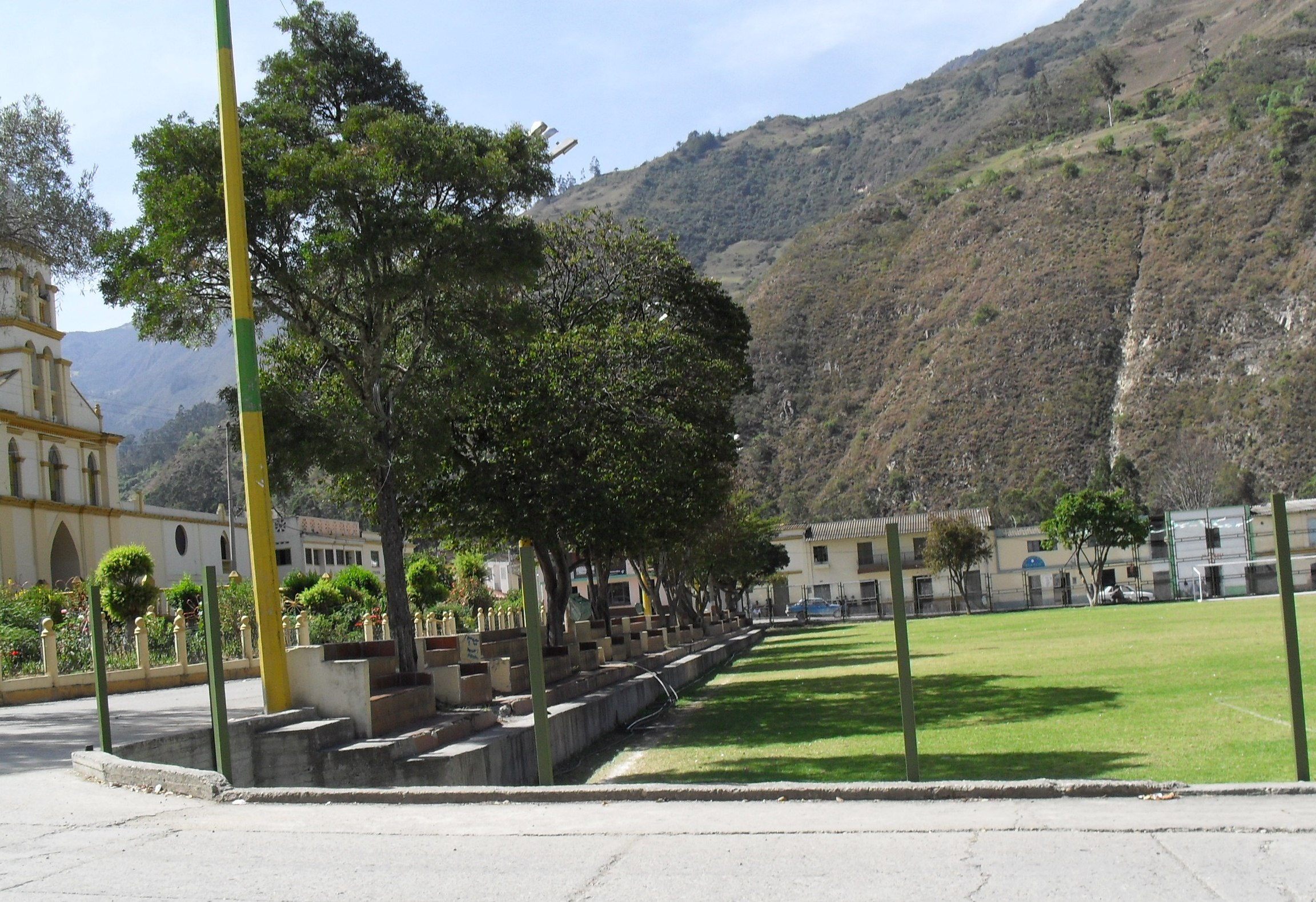

- Flag

- Location of the municipality and town of Panqueba in the Boyacá Department of Colombia.
- Country: Colombia
- Department: Boyacá Department
- Province: Gutiérrez Province

Government
  - Mayor: Jorge Mario Ibáñez Arango (2020-2023)
- Time zone: UTC-5 (Colombia Standard Time)

Panqueba is a town and municipality in the Colombian Department of Boyacá, part of the subregion of the Gutiérrez Province.
