= Chiscas =

Coordinates: 6°32′N 72°30′W

- Municipality and town
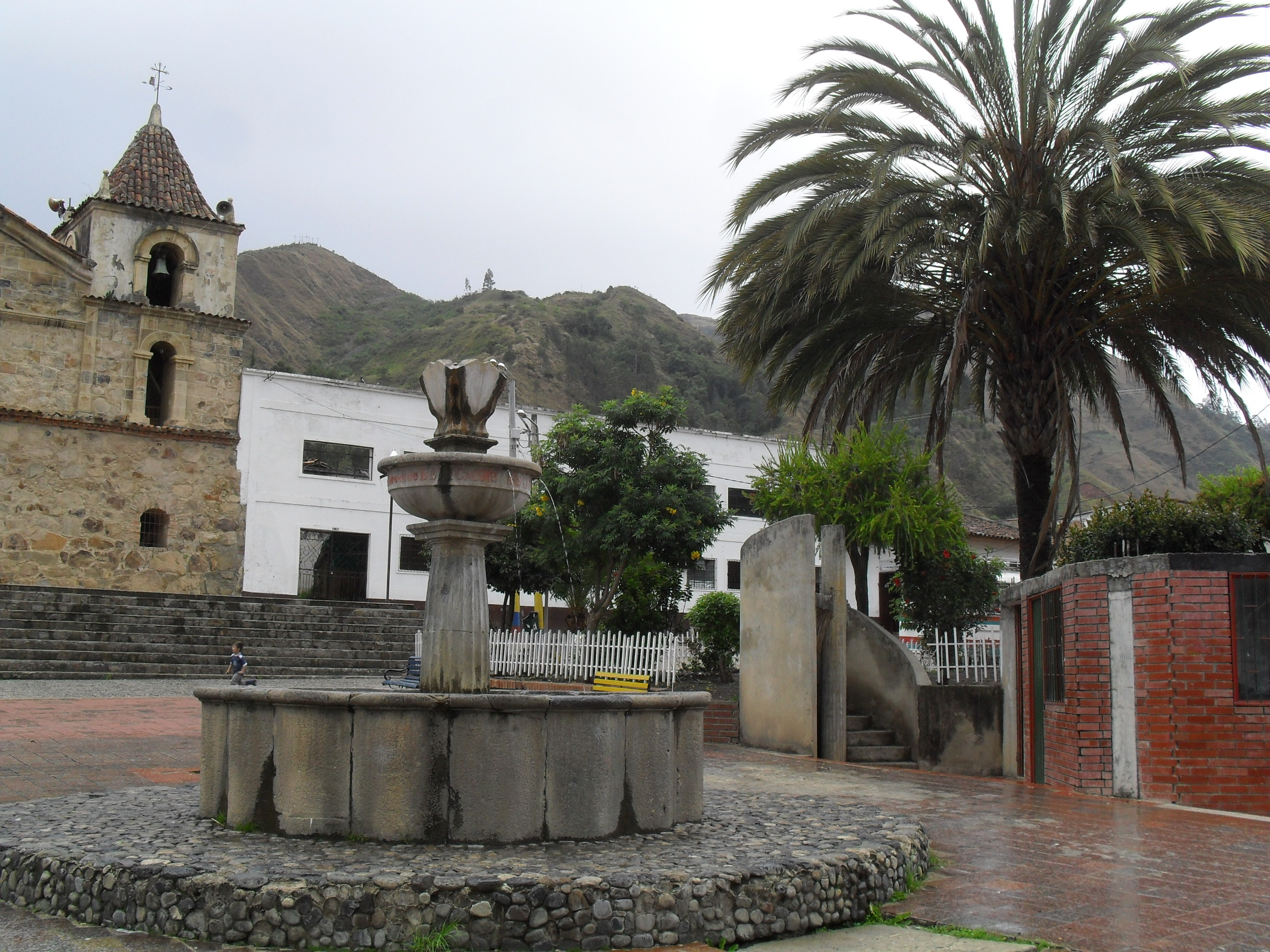

- Flag Coat of arms

- Location of the municipality and town of Chiscas in the Boyacá Department of Colombia
- Country: Colombia
- Department: Boyacá Department
- Province: Gutiérrez Province

Government
  - Mayor: Camilo Andrés Caicedo Silva (2020-2023)
- Time zone: UTC-5 (Colombia Standard Time)

Chiscas is a town and municipality in the Colombian Department of Boyacá, part of the subregion of the Gutiérrez Province.

== Climate ==
Chiscas has a subtropical highland climate (Köppen: Cfb) with frequent rain and consistently mild temperatures.

Climate data for Chiscas, elevation 2,350 m (7,710 ft), (1981–2010)
Month	Jan	Feb	Mar	Apr	May	Jun	Jul	Aug	Sep	Oct	Nov	Dec	Year
Mean daily maximum °C (°F)	23.0 (73.4)	23.2 (73.8)	22.9 (73.2)	22.0 (71.6)	21.4 (70.5)	21.0 (69.8)	21.0 (69.8)	21.3 (70.3)	21.5 (70.7)	21.3 (70.3)	21.3 (70.3)	22.0 (71.6)	21.9 (71.4)
Daily mean °C (°F)	17.3 (63.1)	17.4 (63.3)	17.4 (63.3)	17.1 (62.8)	16.8 (62.2)	16.6 (61.9)	16.4 (61.5)	16.6 (61.9)	16.7 (62.1)	16.6 (61.9)	16.8 (62.2)	17.0 (62.6)	16.9 (62.4)
Mean daily minimum °C (°F)	9.8 (49.6)	10.4 (50.7)	10.7 (51.3)	11.3 (52.3)	11.5 (52.7)	11.0 (51.8)	10.7 (51.3)	10.7 (51.3)	10.6 (51.1)	10.7 (51.3)	10.5 (50.9)	9.8 (49.6)	10.7 (51.3)
Average precipitation mm (inches)	38.0 (1.50)	54.4 (2.14)	87.1 (3.43)	153.7 (6.05)	173.7 (6.84)	110.5 (4.35)	94.0 (3.70)	102.7 (4.04)	131.8 (5.19)	178.4 (7.02)	136.9 (5.39)	55.5 (2.19)	1,316.7 (51.84)
Average precipitation days (≥ 1.0 mm)	9	11	15	22	26	24	23	24	23	25	20	13	235
Average relative humidity (%)	64	65	67	72	75	74	74	73	72	74	73	68	71
Mean monthly sunshine hours	244.9	200.4	186.0	147.0	142.6	129.0	155.0	155.0	141.0	151.9	168.0	220.1	2,040.9
Mean daily sunshine hours	7.9	7.1	6.0	4.9	4.6	4.3	5.0	5.0	4.7	4.9	5.6	7.1	5.6
Source: Instituto de Hidrologia Meteorologia y Estudios Ambientales

== Born in Chiscas ==
- Cristóbal Pérez, former professional cyclist
