= El Cocuy =

Coordinates: 6°25′N 72°25′W

- Municipality and town
- Flag Coat of arms

- Location of the municipality and town of El Cocuy in the Boyacá Department of Colombia
- Country: Colombia
- Department: Boyacá Department
- Province: Gutiérrez Province

Government
  - Mayor: Tomás Ruíz Silva (2020-2023)

Population
  - Urban: 2.758 inhabitants (2,019)
- Time zone: UTC-5 (Colombia Standard Time)

El Cocuy (Spanish pronunciation: [el koˈkuj]) is a town and municipality in the Colombian Department of Boyacá, part of the sub-region of the Gutiérrez Province. The national natural park El Cocuy National Park is nearby.

== Born in El Cocuy ==
- Santos Gutiérrez, former president of Colombia
