= Zion Hwang =

South Korean singer (born 1997/1998)

Zion Hwang (born 1997/1998) is a South Korean social media influencer, música popular singer, and restaurant owner in Colombia. His first single, "¿Culpa de Quién?" (2023), attracted enough attention on social media for Colombian singer Jessi Uribe to collaborate on a remix, launching his music career.

== Career ==
Having moved to Colombia when 19-years-old, he learned how to record videos from his friend and popular Colombian influencer Yeferson Cossio. He garnered attention on TikTok and Instagram in which he was immersed in Colombian culture, chronicled COVID-19 pandemic life, and showed his experience running his Korean restaurant. In travels between Bogotá and Villavicencio, he was exposed to Música popular. Inspired by Jessi Uribe, Paola Jara, and Yeison Jiménez, he released his first single "¿Culpa de Quien?" (2023), under the production of Yohan Usuga. On YouTube it received 3.9 million views in September alone, attracting Uribe. The pair collaborated on a remix and Hwang first performed on-stage. The new version was featured in Usuga's compilation album including Colombian singers like Paola Jara and Pipe Bueno and some regional Mexican artists. Additionally, it was nominated for best regional Colombian collaboration in the Premios Mi Gente 2024.

== Personal life ==
Born in South Korea in 1997 or 1998, he moved to China with his father at a young age. However, there he was bullied and after a few years they returned to Korea. Originally aspiring to play basketball, he was disabled for a month by a car accident and unable to practice. The ensuing bout of depression led his father to send him to Germany to regain motivation, but he quickly returned. Finally, he moved to Colombia as insisted by his father at 19-years-old.

As of September 2024, he has been in a relationship with Colombian model and influencer Stephanie Fernández for 4 years. Hwang is Christian. In September 2026, he was granted an insignia by the Colombian government recognizing him as a citizen after having lived there for 10 years, although he is still subject to the legal process.

== Discography ==
=== Singles ===
- ¿Culpa de Quién? (2023)
- ¿Culpa de Quién? (Remix) (2023), featuring Jessi Uribe
- Infiel (2024)
- Costumbre (2024)
- Copa Vacía (2024)
- El Party (2024)

=== Compilation ===
- Regional Live by Yohan Usuga Vol. 1 (2024)
