= Baltasar Maldonado =

Spanish conquistador

- Born: c. 1510
- Died: 1564 (aged 53–54); Tunja, New Kingdom of Granada
- Occupations: Conquistador
- Years active: 1536-1552
- Known for: Spanish conquest of the Muisca; Defeat of Tundama; Quest for El Dorado
- Spouse: Leonor de Carvajal y Mendoza
- Children: 4
- Father: Francisco Maldonado
- Relatives: Jorge Robledo (brother-in-law)

Baltasar Maldonado, also written as Baltazar Maldonado, (c.1510, Salamanca, Castile – 1564, Tunja, New Kingdom of Granada) was a Spanish conquistador who first served under Gonzalo Jiménez de Quesada, and later in the army of Hernán Pérez de Quesada in the Spanish conquest of the Muisca.

In 1539, Maldonado defeated the last ruling Cacique (chieftain) of the Muisca, Saymoso (called "Tundama" by the Spaniards). Maldonado took part in a quest for El Dorado led by Hernán Pérez de Quesada in the southern regions of present-day Colombia. After this failed expedition, Maldonado went to Popayán and Cali and traveled back to Santafé de Bogotá, the capital of the New Kingdom of Granada where he died in 1552.

The adventures of Maldonado during the first half of the 16th century have been described by scholars Juan de Castellanos, and Juan Rodríguez Freyle in his work El Carnero.

== Early life ==
Maldonado was born in Salamanca in a family of hidalgos, the son of Francisco Maldonado, who served under the Duke of Alba. He married Leonor de Carvajal y Mendoza, and the couple had four children; two sons: Alfonso Maldonado y Carvajal and Alonso Maldonado; and two daughters: María Maldonado y Carvajal and Ana Maldonado de Carvajal. The sister of Leonor de Carvajal married successively Jorge Robledo, Pedro Briceño, and president of Audiencia Francisco Briceño.

== Spanish conquest ==
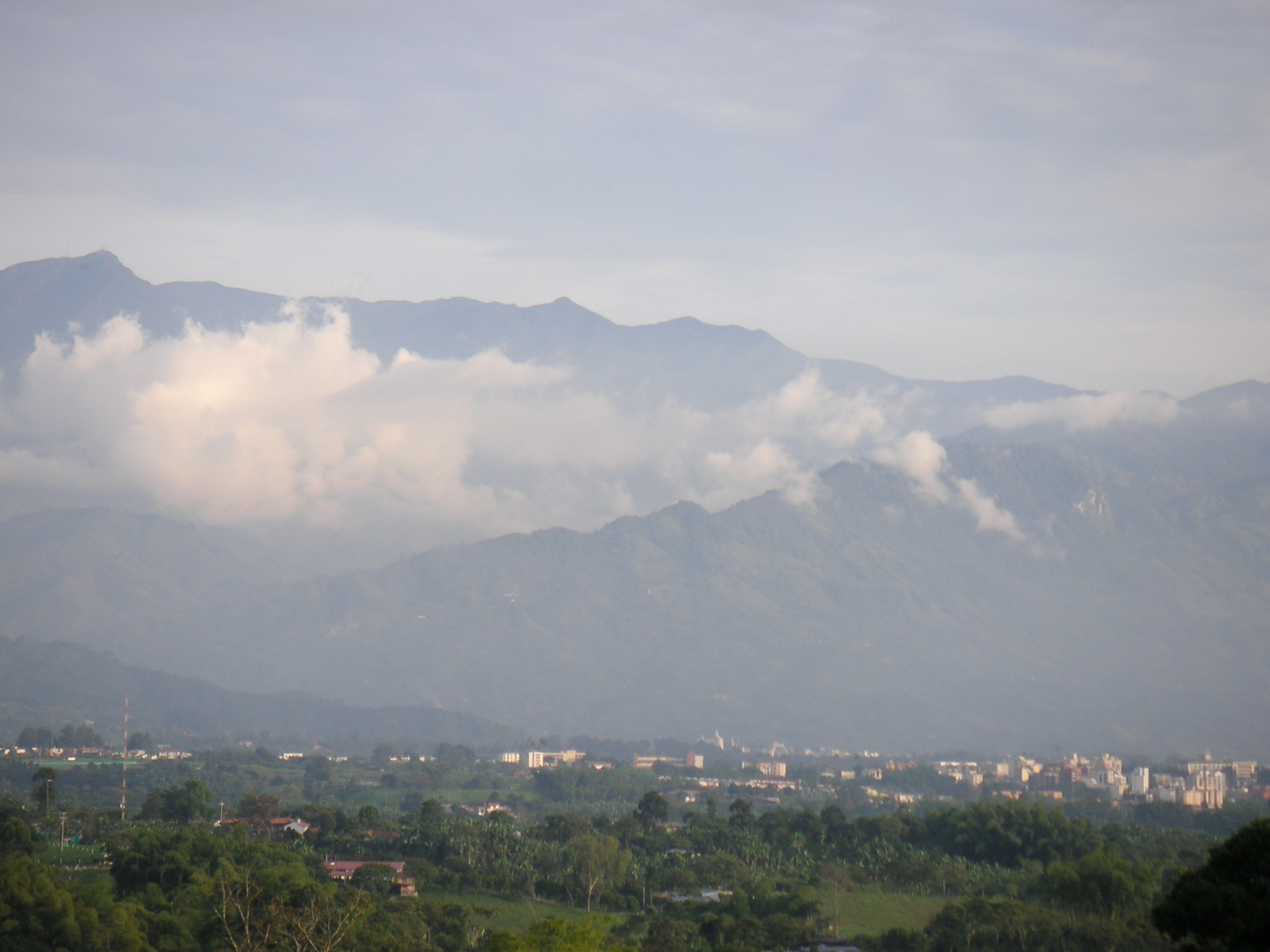
After the conquest of the Muisca groups, Maldonado led an expedition to explore the Nevado del Quindío

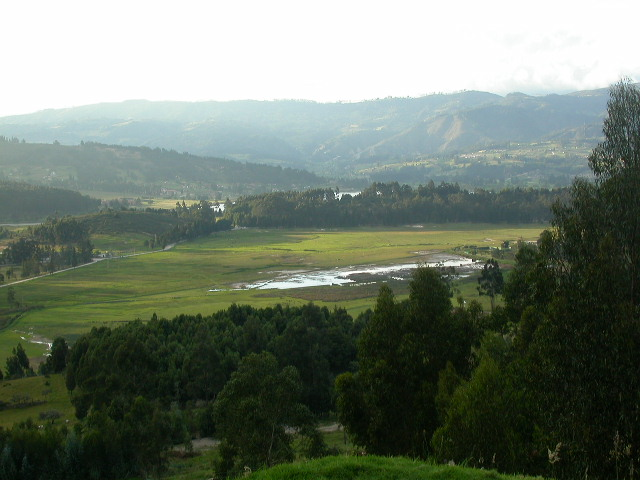
The Vargas Swamp (Pantano de Vargas), was the location of the final battle against Saymoso, December 1539

In 1535, Maldonado traveled from Spain to Santo Domingo and then to Santa Marta., accompanying Santa Marta's interim governor, Rodrigo Infante. The army of the new governor, Pedro Fernández de Lugo, arrived on January 2, 1536, and punitive expeditions against the rebel natives of the area were conducted. Maldonado then joined the expedition led by Fernandez's de Lugo lieutenant, Gonzalo Jiménez de Quesada, whose purpose was to explore the Magdalena River and to find a land path to Peru. The expedition discovered toward the Eastern Ranges where later they encountered two other expeditions: an eastern expedition led by Nikolaus Federmann, and another one led by Sebastián de Belalcázar. Immediately after Bogotá was established (August 6, 1538), the soldiers participated in the Battle of Tocarema in late August to over-power the Panche who lived to the west of the Altiplano Cundiboyacense.

=== Conquest of Tundama ===
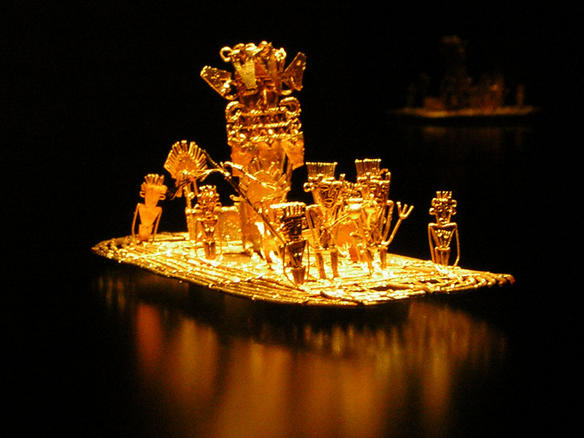
The mythical El Dorado, depicted in the Muisca raft, formed the motive for expedition leader Hernán Pérez de Quesada to travel to the Llanos Orientales, with Maldonado as his main captain.

The Muisca Confederation was separated into federations: The Zipa of Bacatá (the central federation), the Zaque of Hunza (the southern federation), and the Iraca Sugamuxi in Suamox (the northern-most group). Before Fall 1537, the first two had submitted to Spanish rule: Bacatá in April 1537; and then Hunza four months later. The northernmost territories of Suamox were still controlled by the Cacique (or 'King') Tundama, whose bohío was built on an island in the lake of the settlement with the same name, today known as Duitama. Tundama was the last cacique of Duitama and the caciques of Cerinza, Chitagoto, Icabuco, Lupacoche, Sátiva, Soatá and Susacón were loyal to him. Tundama, other than the earlier caciques of the Muisca resisted heavily against the European invaders and punished one of his people who suggested to surrender by cutting off their ears and left hand. Tundama declared a "death war" against the Spanish soldiers and gathered an army of 10,000 guecha warriors.

Maldonado defeated Tundama and 4000 other Muisca in a December 1539 battle, a struggle that took two weeks, culminating in the Battle of Vargas Swamp, close to Paipa, where 280 years later the famous Battle of Vargas Swamp by Simón Bolívar would be fought. Tundama was killed by Maldonado wielding a large hammer.

=== Quest for El Dorado ===
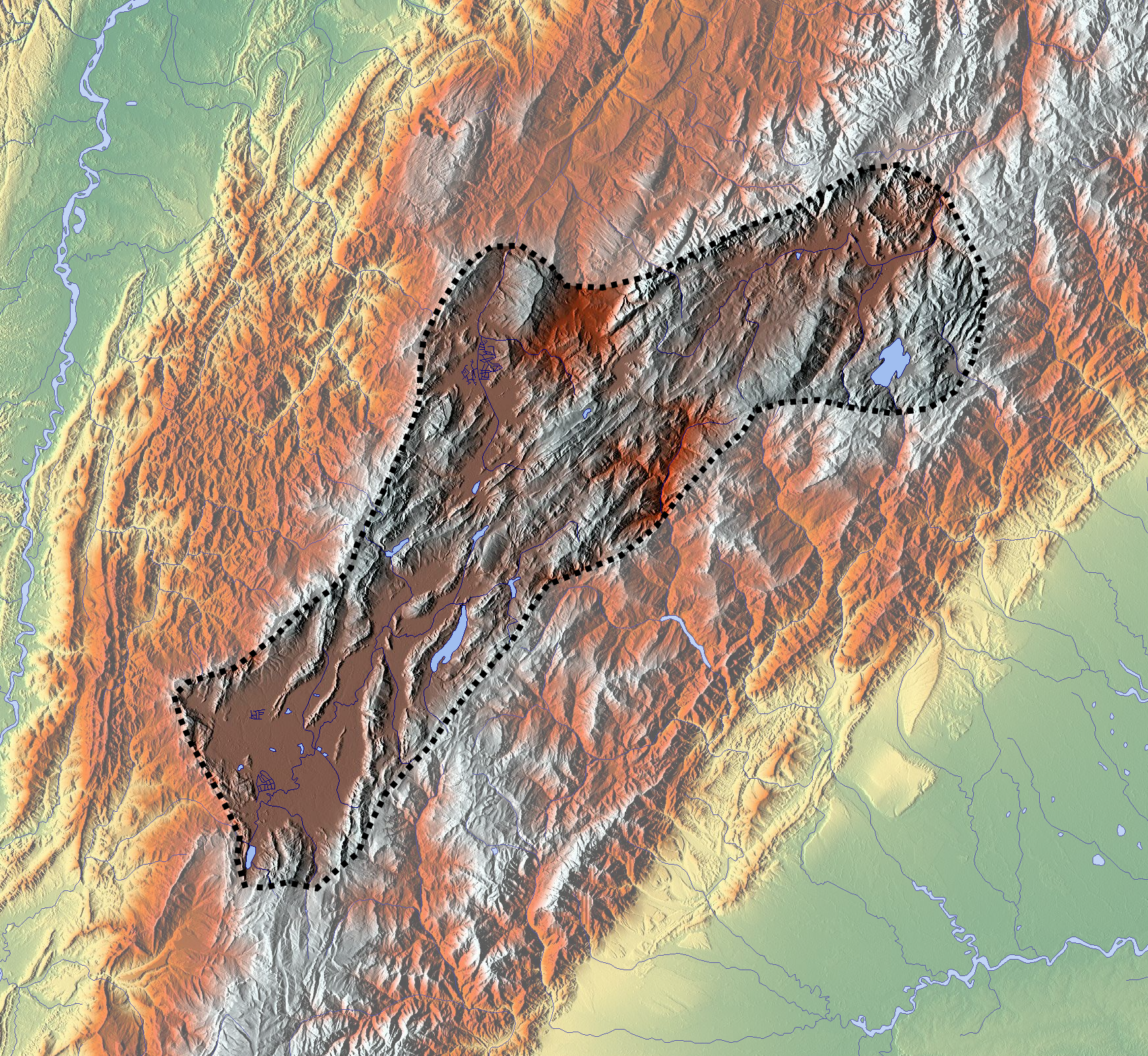
Maldonado explored various parts of the Altiplano Cundiboyacense, home to the Muisca

The mythical city of gold El Dorado was a common legend in the early days of the conquest of what later would become Colombia; the troops of Gonzalo de Quesada were drawn from the relative safety of the Caribbean coast in Santa Marta towards the heart of the Andes, while around the same time the southern expedition led by De Belalcázar heard similar stories in Quito. After the establishment of the New Kingdom of Granada, Gonzalo Jiménez de Quesada left for Spain with De Belalcázar and other soldiers who participated in the conquest and left the reign of the new colony in the hands of his brother, Hernán Pérez de Quesada. Hernán organised an expedition to search for the mythical lands of gold towards the southeast of the Cundiboyacense; the vast flatlands of the Llanos Orientales. The troops left Bogotá in September 1540 and passed through Pasca, that had been founded by fellow conquistador Juan de Céspedes three years earlier.

The conquistadors passed the mountains of the Eastern Ranges and crossed the Guaviare and Papamene Rivers. While crossing one of the many rivers of the Llanos, a horserider of the expedition, Jorge Olmeda, drowned with his horse and an indigenous woman he had taken with him. The Spanish honoured him by naming this the Olmeda River. The soldiers reached La Fragua, a settlement populated by the Choque in the present-day department of Caquetá, where Hernán Pérez de Quesada decided to stay for a while to rest. He sent Maldonado ahead to search for other settlements in the area. Maldonado tried to cross a river but he was halted by the indigenous people living there, who shot poisoned arrows at the conquistador, forcing him to retreat. At night, Maldonado and his men attempted to defeat the indigenous a second time—this time successfully—by ambushing them on a small island in the river. The hurt natives fled and many drowned in the waters. Hernán Pérez de Quesada with the other remaining soldiers joined the troops of Maldonado again in Mocoa, Putumayo to the south. From here, the expedition went back into the Andes to search for food.

Maldonado walked for three days, finally encountering a lush valley in Sibundoy, terrain of the Inga and Kamëntsá. This valley was part of the jurisdiction of the earlier founded Popayán and the colleagues of Maldonado from four years earlier lived in the area. Maldonado, however, was unaware of this and returned to his expedition leader Hernán to report the location of the valley. The troops marched back and found the conquistadors, among which were Molina and Cepeda.

The expedition to find El Dorado had failed because many of the Spanish soldiers died of diseases, poisoned arrows, and drowning in the numerous rivers of the Llanos Orientales and western Amazon River basin. Maldonado's expedition returned to Cali (formerly founded by De Belalcázar).

== Later life and death ==
Maldonado, who had spent years in the conquest of Colombian terrain, returned to Bogotá via Pensilvania. He died in the capital in 1552.

=== Maldonado's expeditions of conquest ===
Name	Department	Date	Year	Notes	Map
Quito	Pichincha	6 December	1534		
Cali (1)	Valle del Cauca		1536		
Popayán (1)	Cauca		1537		
Falán	Tolima		1539		
Mariquita	Tolima		1539		
Manzanares	Caldas		1539		
Marquetalia	Caldas		1539		
Duitama	Boyacá	15 December	1539		
Pasca	Cundinamarca	Early September	1540		
Nevado del Sumapaz	Cundinamarca		1540		
San Martín	Meta		1540		
Florencia	Caquetá		1540		
San José de la Fragua	Caquetá		1540		
Mocoa	Putumayo		1540–41		
Sibundoy	Putumayo		1541		
Popayán (2)	Cauca		1541		
Cali (2)	Valle del Cauca		1541		
Pensilvania	Caldas		1541–1550		

== The Maldonado family ==
Shield of the Maldonado family

The Maldonado family lived in Salamanca, Spain. Notable is Francisco Maldonado, who was a leader in the Revolt of the Comuneros. Various conquistadors and other people involved in the Spanish colonization of the Americas from the Maldonado family are known in history.

- Bituima, Diego Carasquilla Maldonado — became an oídor for Santa Fe de Bogotá in Lima;
- (Francisco) Arias Maldonado — who also served under De Belálcazar and became encomendero of Sora in Boyacá;
- Francisco de Grado Maldonado – son of Isabel Maldonado, was a conquistador in Peru.
- Francisco Maldonado Dorado del Hierro — served under German conquistadors Georg von Speyer and Nikolaus Federmann, and was later made encomendero of Sasaima; and
- Isabel Maldonado, married to two conquistadors: Pedro Núñez Cabrera and, following his death, Miguel Holguín y Figueroa.
- Juan Maldonado — another conquistador in Colombia and son-in-law of Ortún Velázquez de Velasco;
- Juan Prieto Maldonado — conquistador in Tunja;
- Rodrigo Arias de Maldonado — conquistador in New Spain;

== See also ==
- List of conquistadors in Colombia

== Bibliography ==
- Rodríguez Freyle, Juan; Achury Valenzuela, Darío (1979) [1859 (1638)], El Carnero - Conquista i descubrimiento del nuevo reino de Granada de las Indias Occidentales del mar oceano, i fundacion de la ciudad de Santa Fe de Bogota (PDF) (in Spanish), Fundacion Biblioteca Ayacuch, pp. 1–598, archived from the original (PDF) on 2020-08-07
