= Alto Oriente Subregion =

Upper Eastern District Distrito Alto Oriente
- District
- Country: Colombia
- Department: Caldas
- Time zone: UTC−5 (COT)

The Upper Eastern District is a subregion of the Colombian Department of Caldas.

- Manzanares
- Marquetalia
- Marulanda
- Pensilvania
