= Darío Gómez =

Colombian musical artist (1951–2022)

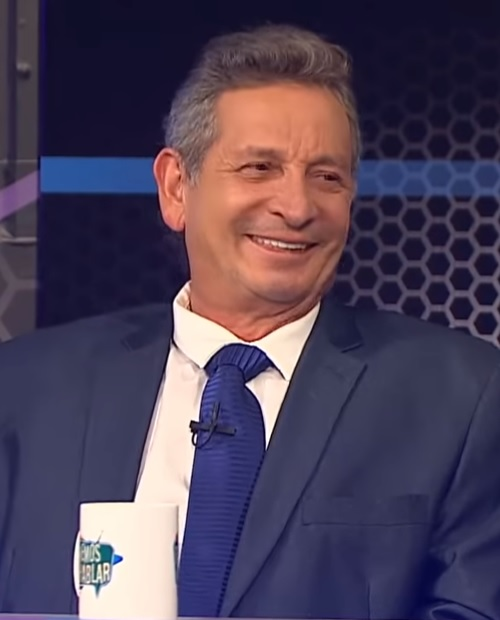
- Darío Gómez in 2020

Background information
- Also known as: El Rey del Despecho
- Born: Darío de Jesús Gómez Zapata; 6 February 1951; San Jerónimo, Antioquia, Colombia
- Died: 26 July 2022 (aged 71) Medellín, Antioquia, Colombia
- Genres: Popular, Ranchera
- Occupations: Singer, composer
- Years active: 1978–2022
- Website: www.discosdago.com

Darío de Jesús Gómez Zapata (6 February 1951 – 26 July 2022), simply called Darío Gómez, was a singer and composer of Música popular, known by the nickname "El Rey del Despecho" ("king of heartbreak"), in reference to the "despecho" musical style for which he was famous.

He began his career with the group Los Legendarios, before setting up his own record label. Over his career he sold more than six million albums sold in national and international markets. He is best known for the song "Nadie es eterno" ("Nobody Is Eternal"), as well as composing songs such as "La oveja negra" ("The Black Sheep"), "Tú y la gente" ("You and the People"), "El hijo del amor" ("The Son of Love"), "El rey del despecho" ("The King of Spite") and "Corazón resentido" ("Resentful Heart"). He also interpreted songs such as "Sobreviviré" ("I Will Survive").

== Biography ==
Darío De Jesus Gómez Zapata began writing verses at age 14 and seeking support while working as a mechanic and farmer. While in Medellín, on the recommendation of a friend, he came to Codiscos, where his musical production was announced. In 1977 Gómez already worked as artistic director in this company. In his notes were highlighted themes of December, the picaresque tone, vallenatos and dance. It was then when he decided to integrate with his brother Heriberto Gómez in the group "Los Legendarios". His first great success is "Ángel perdido", he was inspired by the death of his sister Rosangela, on 31 October 1978.

In 1985, Darío Gómez made his debut as a soloist and scored a new triumph when he performed "Decidelo (Decide it)"; then he released his first full length with the name of Así se le canta al despecho (This is how it is sung to spite).

On 14 May 2015, Gómez released the video of "me voy a casar (I'm going to marry)" next to the King of Popular Music Jhonny Rivera. On 11 August, he would release the remix of No Hay Razón Para Odiarte (There's no reason to hate you) in collaboration with Yelsid and Andy Rivera recording a reggaeton for the first time.

Gómez died at the age of 71 at Clínica Las Américas in Medellín, where he was sent after losing consciousness. At the clinic, he showed no vital signs, and resuscitation attempts failed. His cause of death has not been revealed.

== Production and successes ==
Darío Gómez has more than thirty productions, including:

- Nadie es Eterno (No One's Eternal)
- Entre Comillas (Between Quotation Marks)
- Las Despechadas (The Spiteful Women)
- Si Negabas que Buscabas (If You Denied That You Were Looking For)
- No Puedo Vivir Sin Tí (I Cannot Live Without You)
- Respétame (Respect Me)
- La Torcida (The Crooked Chick)
- La Descontinuada (Discontinued Woman)
- Sobreviviré (I Will Survive)
- Sabor y Aroma (Taste and Aroma)
- Así se le Canta al Despecho (That's How You Sing to Spite)
- Nostalgia del Ayer (Nostalgia of Yesterday)
- Corazonada (Hunch)
- La Tirana (The Tyrant Woman)
- El Hijo del Amor (The Son of Love)
- Me RÍo de TÍ (I Laugh At You)
- Mi Renuncia (My Resignation)
- la novia del chofer (the driver's girlfriend)

== Discography ==
- 1976 - Navidad Sin Flores (Flowerless Christmas) (Con los invisibles - Parrandero - Discos Nave)
- 1977 - La Novia del Chofer (Driver's Girlfriend) (Parrandero - Codiscos)
- 1978 - Esta por ayudarme, Darío Gómez and José Muñoz (Parrandero - Codiscos)
- 1979 - El zapatero (The Shoemaker) (Parrandero - Codiscos)
- 1984 - Pensando en Ella (Thinking on Her)
- 1985 - Con ella soy el rey (With Her, I'm the King)
- 1986 - Ahora 14 éxitos con Darío Gómez - Así se le canta al despecho (Now, 14 Hits with Dario Gomez - That's How You Sing to Spite)
- 1988 - Diez años de éxitos (10 Years of Hits)
- 1988 - Cómo la ve pa'l 2000 (How Do You Get It For 2000) (Parrandero)
- 1989 - Darío Gómez, nuestro ídolo (Dario Gomez, Our Idol)
- 1990 - Los Legendarios y punto (The Legendary Ones, Period)
- 1992 - El Rey del Despecho (King of Despite)
- 1993 - Ahí estaba (I Was There)
- 1994 - Amigos, ojalá que la vida nos alcance (Buddies, I Hope We Have Enough Life)
- 1996 - Incomparable (Matchless)
- 1997 - Otra vez me amanezco (Again, I Wake Up)
- 1998 - Único (Unique)
- 1999 - Nuevo Milenio (New Millennium)
- 2000 - Lo máximo (The Maximum)
- 2001 - Oro y plata (Gold and Silver)
- 2003 - Perdurable
- 2004 - Sólo corridos (Only Corridos)
- 2005 - 30 Años de vida artística - Que sea un motivo (30 Artistic Life Years - )
- 2009 - La traga (The Gulping)
- 2012 - Me río de ti (I Laugh At You)

== Distinctions and awards ==
Some of the distinctions he has received are the Ascap prize for his composition of Nobody is eternal, in New York, the Golden Pentagram, and the crown of the King of the Despecho. In 2007 the master Darío has ventured into the world of acting for television. In 2009 he would star in a campaign for the company Telefónica Telecom Colombia.

== Collaborations ==
- Te Pido Perdón (I Ask You To Forgive Me) (feat. Pasabordo)
- Un Clavo Saca Otro Clavo (One Nail Pulls Out Another Nail) (feat. Alfredo Gutiérrez)
- La Reina y El Rey (The Queen and The King) (feat. Arelys Henao)
- Me Voy A Casar (I'm Gonna Get Married) (feat. Jhonny Rivera)
- A Punta de Licor (At Liquor Bangs) (feat. Jhon Alex Castaño)
- No Hay Razón Para Odiarte (There's No Reason To Hate You) (Remix) (feat. Yelsid & Andy Rivera)
- Historia (History) (feat. Giovanny Ayala)
- Las Adivinanzas (The Riddles) (feat. Joaquin Bedoya)

== See also ==
- Alfredo Gutiérrez (musician)
- Jhonny Rivera
- Música popular (Colombia)
- Olimpo Cárdenas
- Óscar Agudelo
