= Marquetalia, Caldas =

- Municipality and town
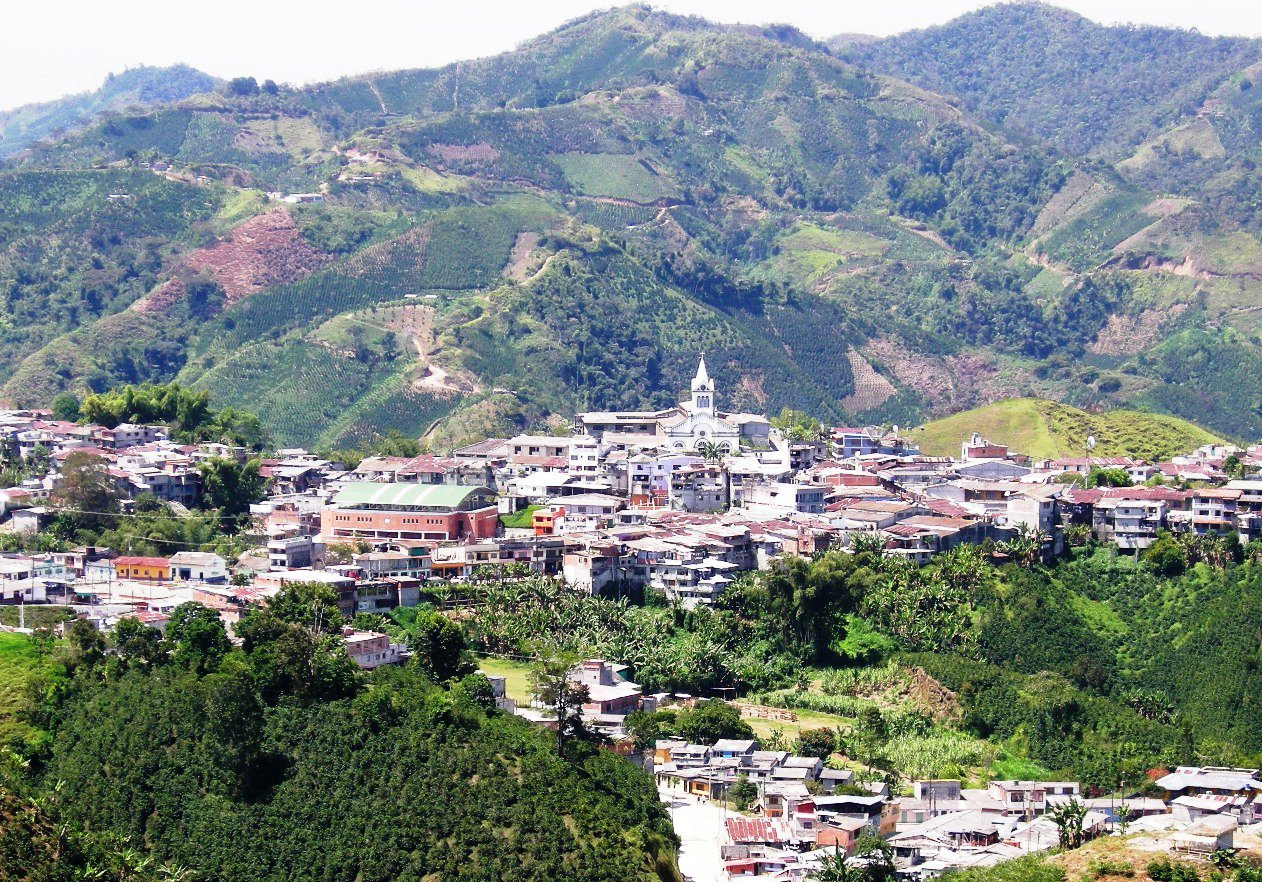
- View of Marquetalia

- Flag Coat of arms
- Nickname: La Villa del Sol (Village of the Sun)
- Motto(s): Trabajo, paz y progreso. (Work, peace and progress.)
- Location of the municipality and town of Marquetalia, Caldas in the Caldas Department of Colombia.

- Location in Colombia
- Coordinates: 5°17′49″N 75°3′11″W
- Country: Colombia
- Department: Caldas Department
- Founded: 1903
- Incorporated: April 15th, 1924

Government
  - Mayor: Edwin Jesús Sánchez Aristizábal (2024-2027)

Area
  - Municipality and town: 90.3 km^{2} (34.9 sq mi)
  - Urban: 0.89 km^{2} (0.34 sq mi)
- Elevation: 1,600 m (5,200 ft)

Population (2025)
  - Municipality and town: 13,763
  - Density: 152/km^{2} (395/sq mi)
  - Urban: 7,324
- Demonyms: Marquetón/Marquetona
- Time zone: UTC-5 (Colombia Standard Time)

Marquetalia is a town and municipality in the Colombian Department of Caldas. It is situated on the eastern side of the Cordillera Central and is part of the highland region known as the Oriente Caldense (eastern Caldas) or Alto Oriente (high east). Inhabited originally by native american tribes called Amaníes, Pantágoras or Palenques by Spanish colonizers, Marquetalia became permanently settled at the end of the 19th century by a wave of creole colonizers from Antioquia, a phenomenon known as the colonización antioqueña (Antioquian colonization). With an economy that revolves mainly around the production of coffee, avocado, plantain, cacao and sugar cane, among other agricultural practices such as cattle ranching, Marquetalia ranked 22nd out of the 27 municipalities that contribute to Caldas' gross domestic product in 2022, with an average annual per capita income of approximately $9.2 million pesos (about USD $2500). It is the third smallest municipality by area of Caldas behind Marmato and La Merced.

== Etymology ==
Originally established as the Corregimiento de Risaralda in 1903, then officially incorporated as the town of Núñez in 1924 and finally named Marquetalia in 1930, it is believed that its current name stems from the metaplasm of the title given to native tribal leaders, either mareketá, malchita or marikita. It shares a notable similarity with the name of the nearby, but much older town of Mariquita, which is immediately adjacent to its south-east in the department of Tolima.

=== Misconception ===
Marquetalia is often mistaken with a rural area with the same name that is part of the town of Planadas in southern Tolima, which was the birthplace of the extinct guerrilla group FARC-EP. Dissidents of this group that have remained in open conflict with the Colombian government have called for the establishment of a Segunda Marquetalia, alluding to a re-creation of the self-proclaimed independent republic founded there in the 1960s, but this makes no reference to the Caldas town of Marquetalia, which is located 386 kms (240 miles) north of Marquetalia, Tolima.

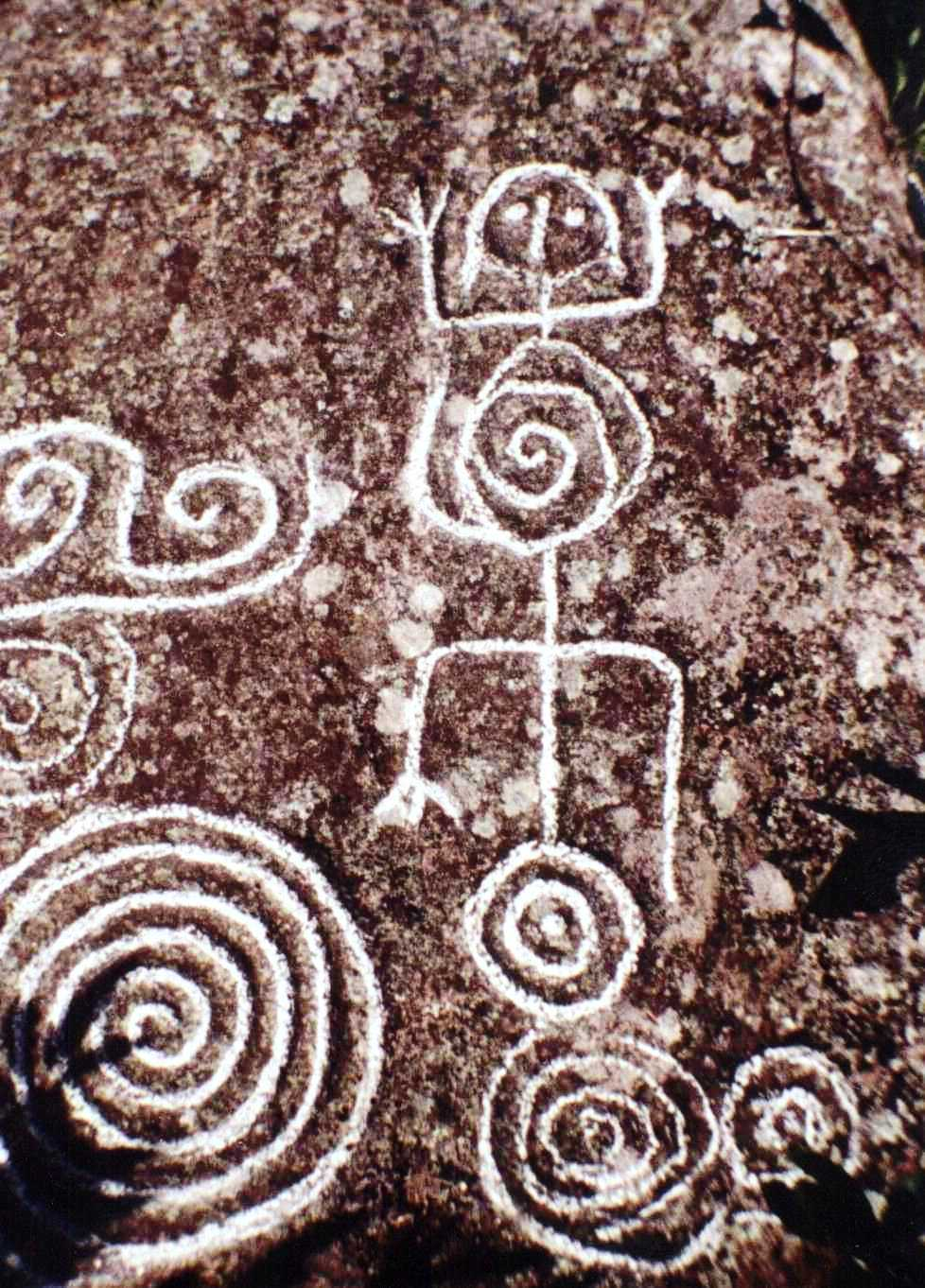
Native art of the Rocks of Caracolí.

== History ==
=== Indigenous Past and Spanish Conquest ===
Little is known about the native peoples that occupied the area where Marquetalia currently stands before Spanish and creole colonization, except that they are referred to as Amaníes, Marquetones, Pantágoras, Palenques and Panches, sometimes interchangeably. The name palenque, in particular, seems to make reference to the type of fortifications used by indigenous tribes in defense of the territories they claimed, which consisted of sharp wooden stakes made of black palm trees, according to the second-hand account made by the chronicler Pedro Cieza de León in 1536. On the other hand, historians have also discussed that the name pantágora is a misspelling from the name patángora, which was given by the Spaniards to a tribe or group of tribes that often used the prefix "patan" in their words.

It has been argued that the territory began to see Spanish conquistadors in 1549 under captain Baltasar Maldonado and later on by Hernán Venegas Carrillo and Francisco Núñez Pedroso. It is said that these explorers identified some areas with a potential for mining, but desisted of their conquest efforts after encountering highly aggressive native American tribes.

The tribes' customs and social structures were not well understood by Spanish colonizers, although the figure of cacique, or tribal chief, was present in some of these and was recognizable to the Europeans. Their main crop is believed to have been maize. 11 petroglyphs containing what is accepted to be prehispanic art can be found in different veredas or rural localities near the town center, and some of these have acquired a legally protected status.

Regarding the iconic Cacica Marquetona, or Marquetalian Chief, historian Soledad Acosta de Samper argues that she could have been an indigenous woman who, in spite of holding legend status for her leadership role during Spanish conquest and being a symbol of identity for Marquetalians, was, in fact, a mistress or slave by the name of Mariquita taken by the conquistador Gonzalo Jiménez de Quesada to the founding of the city of San Sebastián, today known as Mariquita, in 1552. Nevertheless, there is no consensus either on the identity of the cacica or the origin of the name Marquetalia.

=== Between the 16th and the 19th centuries ===
The region was not actively colonized by Europeans or European descendants until the Antioquian expansion reached these territories in the second half of the 19th century; hence, these in-between centuries are seen as an obscure period for historians of Marquetalia. However, it has been argued that the transcendental Royal Botanical Expedition to New Granada, which had its original base in nearby Mariquita, Tolima and was led by Spanish priest José Celestino Mutis, may have passed through the path that is now Marquetalia´s main road, which has been in use since prehispanic times and has had the important role of connecting southern Antioquia to the Magdalena River, Colombia's most important fluvial body.

=== First half of the 20th century ===
Although Manzanares and Victoria were founded in 1863 and 1879 respectively, Marquetalia, who is in the middle of both towns, was not officially founded until 1903, with records indicating first signs of colonizing activity in 1885. Its founding was an effect of the migration wave of Antioquians and Tolimenses (people belonging to the departments of Antioquia and Tolima) who arrived to the unexploited territories of today's departments of Quindio, Risaralda and Caldas in search for economic growth, particularly for arable land, silver and gold. This event is known as the Colonización Antioqueña and it attracted both Colombian-born colonizers, as well as Spaniards, many of them of Basque origin.

Marquetalia was officially declared a town under the name of Núñez on April 15th, 1924 after being part of Manzanares under the name of Corregimiento de Risaralda since its foundation. Its main catholic church, the Templo de Nuestra Señora de los Dolores (Our Lady of Sorrows Temple), was built between 1936 and 1954 featuring gothic, romanesque and renaissance elements, three naves and an apse.

=== Second half of the 20th century ===
A celebrated figure in the history of Marquetalia is that of father Antonio Hincapié Soto, a catholic priest who arrived in Marquetalia in 1957 at the end of the period known as La Violencia and who initiated a social transformation in the municipality.

Father Hincapié was crucial in the establishment and building of the Instituto Juan XXIII, the Escuela Normal Superior Nuestra Señora de la Candelaria and the Institución Educativa Antonio María Hincapié Soto (located in Santa Elena) public schools. He also created the Society for Mutual Aid that offered funeral services to poor families for a small fee, established a program for widows and orphans of scarce means, donated parish lands for the creation of the El Paraíso gereatric home and sold other church terrains in 1964 for the erection of the Hospital San Cayetano.

Marquetalia's main square is named after the revered priest and the Fiestas de la Cordillera, a folk festival that occurs every two years and which celebrates Marquetalia´s culture, began in 1965 after the first cohort of students graduated from the Instituto Juan XXIII founded by Hincapié.

== Geography and Climate ==
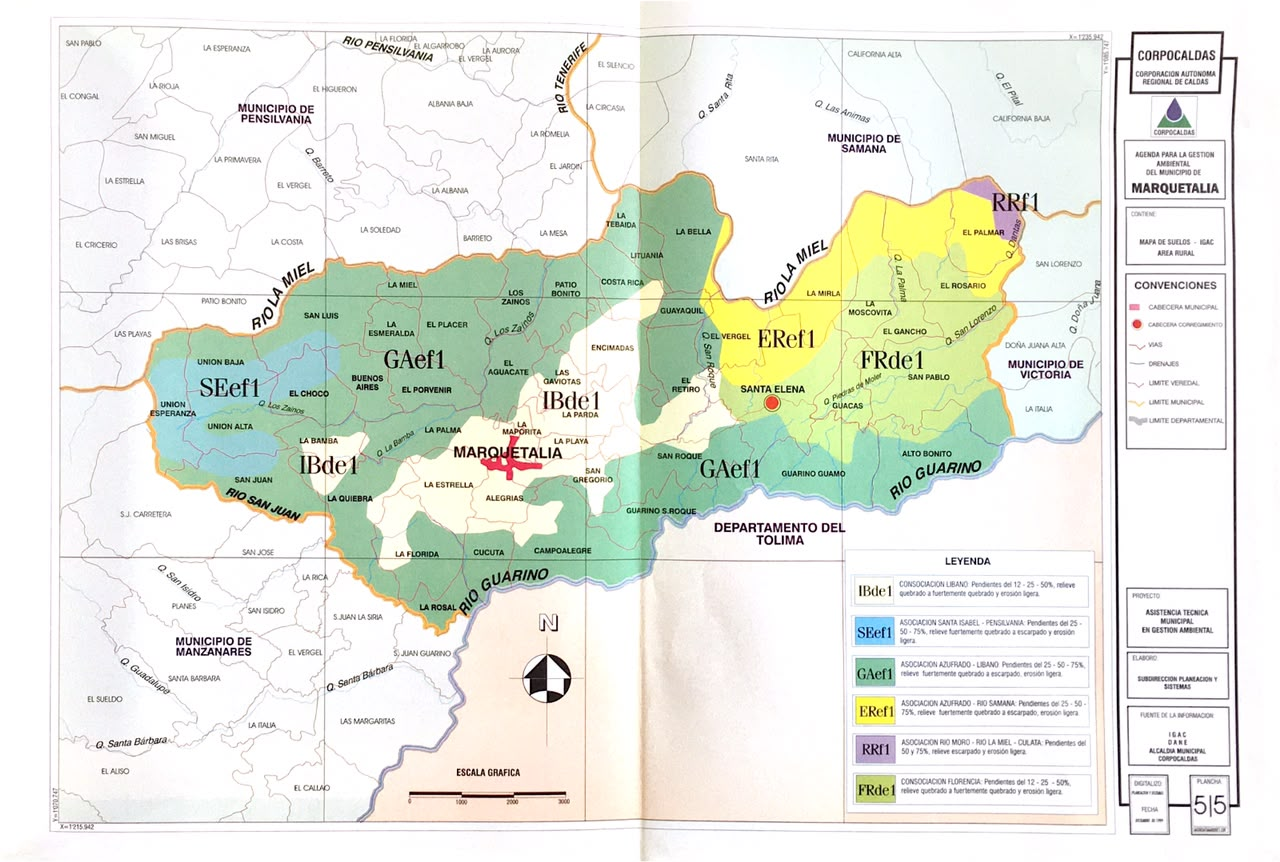
Soil map of Marquetalia.

Marquetalia is located 146 km (about 90 miles) from the city of Manizales, capital of the department of Caldas, and 216 km (134 miles) from Bogotá, Colombia's capital city. It limits to the north with Pensilvania and Samaná, to the east with Victoria, to the southeast with Mariquita, to the south with Fresno and to the west with Manzanares.

The municipality of Marquetalia has a cool tropical rainforest climate (Af) due to its altitude, with areas ranging from around 800 mts (2,624 ft) on the east to 1900 mts (6,233 ft) on the west; the town itself is 1550 mts (5,200 ft) above sea level. Although it is nicknamed Village of the Sun, the area can experience both intense rains as well as hot and dry seasons; April and October being the rainiest months, while January and July being the driest. Temperatures can reach highs below 29 C° (84 F°) and fall to 17 C° (62 F°) depending on the time of day, altitude and season, with an average temperature of 23 C°. Average monthly rainfall is approximately 228 mm.

Climate data for Marquetalia, elevation 1,450 m (4,760 ft), (1981–2010)
Month	Jan	Feb	Mar	Apr	May	Jun	Jul	Aug	Sep	Oct	Nov	Dec	Year
Mean daily maximum °C (°F)	24.2 (75.6)	24.3 (75.7)	24.3 (75.7)	24.1 (75.4)	24.2 (75.6)	24.7 (76.5)	24.8 (76.6)	25.0 (77.0)	24.6 (76.3)	23.5 (74.3)	23.6 (74.5)	23.8 (74.8)	24.3 (75.7)
Daily mean °C (°F)	20.1 (68.2)	20.2 (68.4)	20.3 (68.5)	20.2 (68.4)	20.3 (68.5)	20.7 (69.3)	20.8 (69.4)	20.9 (69.6)	20.3 (68.5)	19.6 (67.3)	19.6 (67.3)	19.8 (67.6)	20.2 (68.4)
Mean daily minimum °C (°F)	16.9 (62.4)	16.9 (62.4)	17.0 (62.6)	17.1 (62.8)	17.1 (62.8)	17.2 (63.0)	16.8 (62.2)	16.6 (61.9)	16.3 (61.3)	16.4 (61.5)	16.6 (61.9)	16.7 (62.1)	16.8 (62.2)
Average precipitation mm (inches)	212.9 (8.38)	272.3 (10.72)	303.0 (11.93)	337.0 (13.27)	346.3 (13.63)	191.3 (7.53)	134.2 (5.28)	229.1 (9.02)	300.9 (11.85)	377.2 (14.85)	356.7 (14.04)	252.8 (9.95)	3,313.7 (130.45)
Average precipitation days	14	14	16	18	17	11	9	11	15	17	18	15	175
Average relative humidity (%)	85	83	85	86	84	77	70	71	79	85	88	87	82
Mean monthly sunshine hours	130.2	101.8	105.4	93.0	120.9	162.0	180.0	195.3	162.0	111.6	111.0	117.8	1,591
Mean daily sunshine hours	4.2	3.6	3.4	3.1	3.9	5.4	6.0	6.3	5.4	3.6	3.7	3.8	4.4
Source: Instituto de Hidrologia Meteorologia y Estudios Ambientales

There are two Holdridge life zones in Marquetalia: premontane wet forest in the western and central regions, where temperatures average 18 to 20°C (64 to 68°F), altitudes range between 900 and 2000 m (2952 to 6561 ft.) and rainfall can measure from 2000 to 4000 mm/year; and tropical moist forest in the southern and northeastern regions, where temperatures go beyond 24°C (75°F) on average and annual rainfall can be anywhere between 400 and 4000 mm.

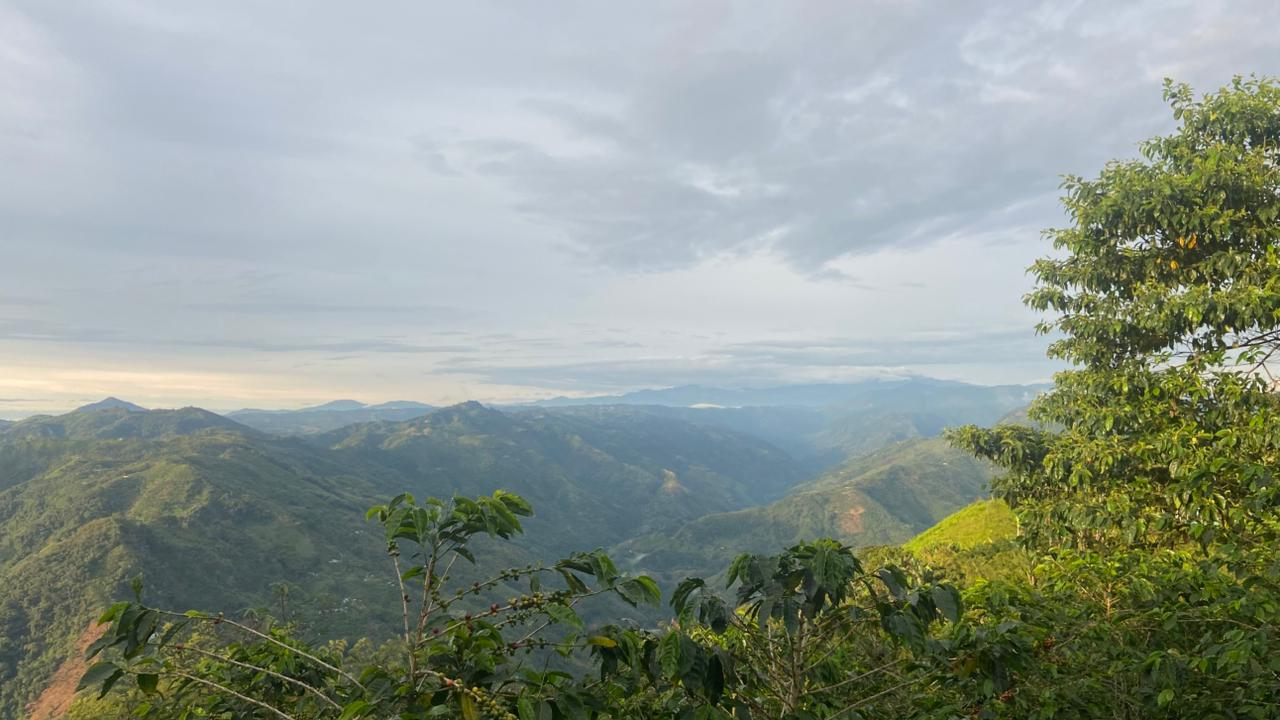
South view from Marquetalia, Caldas, to the Tolima Department and the Guarinó river canyon.

It is estimated that only 2% of the total area of Marquetalia is flat, the rest being undulated or severely fragmented. Notable peaks and hilltops are the Alto de Penagos (1780 m), Cerro de la Laguna (2330 m), Alto de la Cruz and Cerro de Morrogacho. The Unión Esperanza lagoon is another notable natural attraction located on the west up the San Juan river.

The three main rivers are the La Miel to the north, Guarinó to the south and the San Juan to the west, potable water being obtained from the last. While these are fed by 18 microbasins and feature many brookes and cascades, the most prominent waterfalls include La Paila, El Tigre, La Parda and Dantas on the La Miel river; El Hospital, Minitas, La Zona and Danticas on the Guarinó river; and the Penagos on the San Juan.

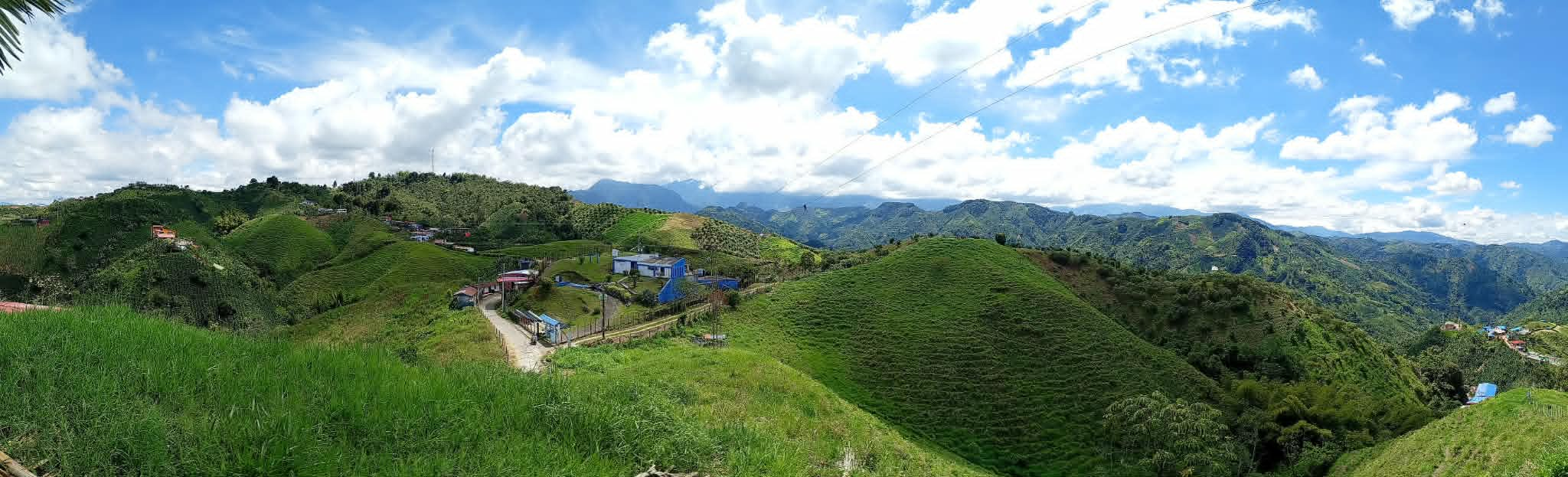
Nearby hills of the Central Cordillera west of Marquetalia.

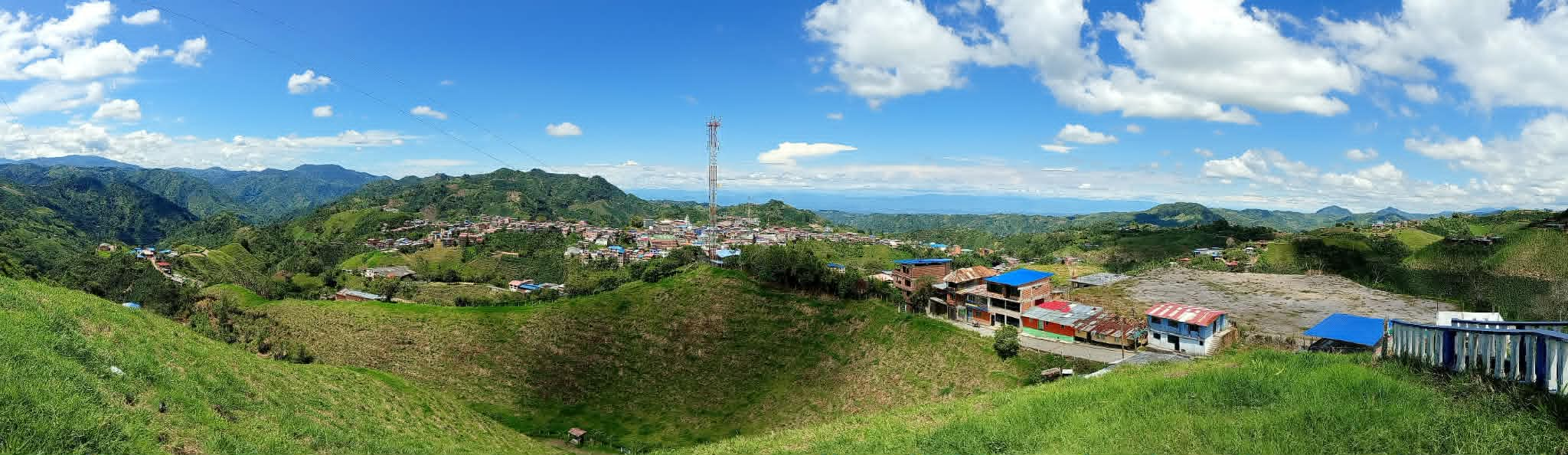
Panoramic view of Marquetalia from the Alto de la Cruz with the Magdalena river valley on the horizon.

== Flora and fauna ==
The San Juan microbasin in the west is considered to be the most biodiverse region in Marquetalia as an effect of its steepness and difficulty of access to people.

=== Flora ===
The colonization of the region has transformed the quality, composition and extension of the diverse native forests, nonetheless, native tree species can still be found. Some of these include: Yarumo, Balso, Comino, Cedar, Cedrillo, Chingalé or Jacaranda, Walnut, Guadua, Arboloco (Smallanthus Pyramidalis), Quiebrabarrigo, Chilca (Baccharis Latifolia), Ferns, Juncus, Guayabo de Monte, Gallinazo (Schizolobium parahyba), Laurel, Limoncillo and Carate.

Notably, Guamo, Nogal, Cedar, Guayacán and Carbonero (Calliandra Pettieri) trees are often used to provide shade to coffee trees. Rubber and Cacao trees have also been introduced, with about 133 Ha planted by the year 2000. Scattered Guadua forests amounted up to 45 Ha in the same year.

=== Fauna ===
Due to Colombia's topographic and climatic variety, it is recognized for being one of the most biodiverse countries in the world, and it's well known for being home to the most number of species of birds on the planet. Over 250 of these have been registered in Marquetalia, belonging to the following families and subfamilies:

- Tinamou, Guan, New World quail, Columbidae or Pigeon, Cuckoo, Nighthawk, Potoo, Swift, Hummingbird, Rail, Plover, Heron, New World vulture, Hawk, Owl, Motmots, Kingfisher, Puffbird, New World barbet, Toucan, Woodpecker, Falcon, New World sparrow, Antbird, Tapaculo, Ovenbird, Manakin, Becards, Tyrant flycatcher, Vireo, Jay, Swallow, Gnatwrens, Wren, Dipper, Mockingbird, Thrush, Finch, Thursh-Tanagers, New World sparrow, Blackbird, Wood warbler, Mitrospingid Tanagers, Cardinalis, Tanager.

== Culture ==
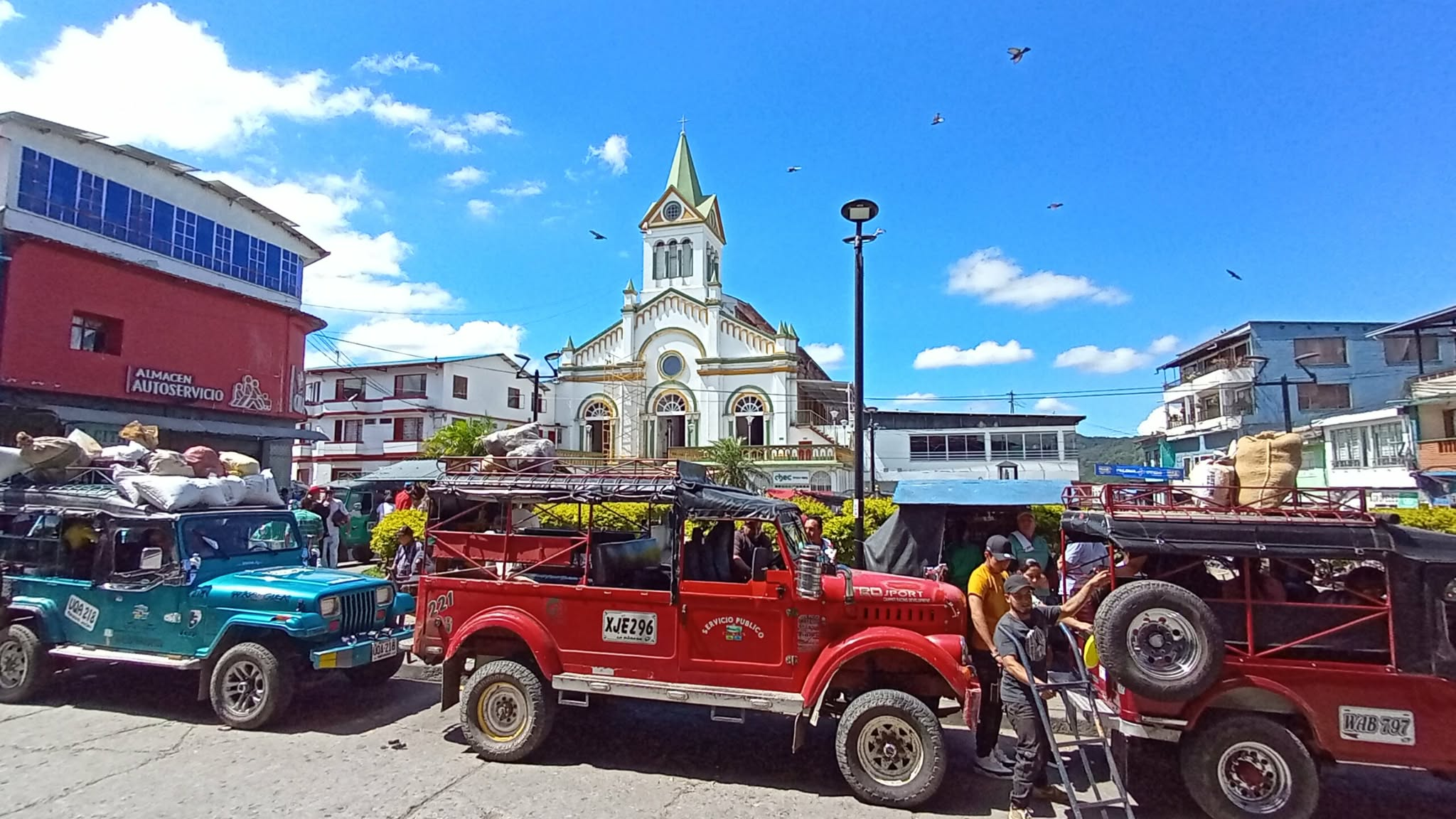
"Yipaos" stationed in front of the Parroquia de Nuestra Señora de los Dolores (Our Lady of Sorrows Parish) in Marquetalia's main square.

Historically, the department of Caldas has been one of the most prolific growers of coffee in Colombia, with 57,880 Ha (143,024 Acres) of coffee being cultivated across the small department in 2026. Due to the oscillation of its climate, its altitude, as well as its rich soil, Marquetalia is likewise heavily dependent on the production and commercialization of products related to the cultivation of coffee, including farm equipment, coffee plants and green and dried coffee beans. According to data provided by the National Coffee Federation of Colombia, most coffee farms in the department are run by local families and are usually below 5 Ha (12,36 Acres) in size.

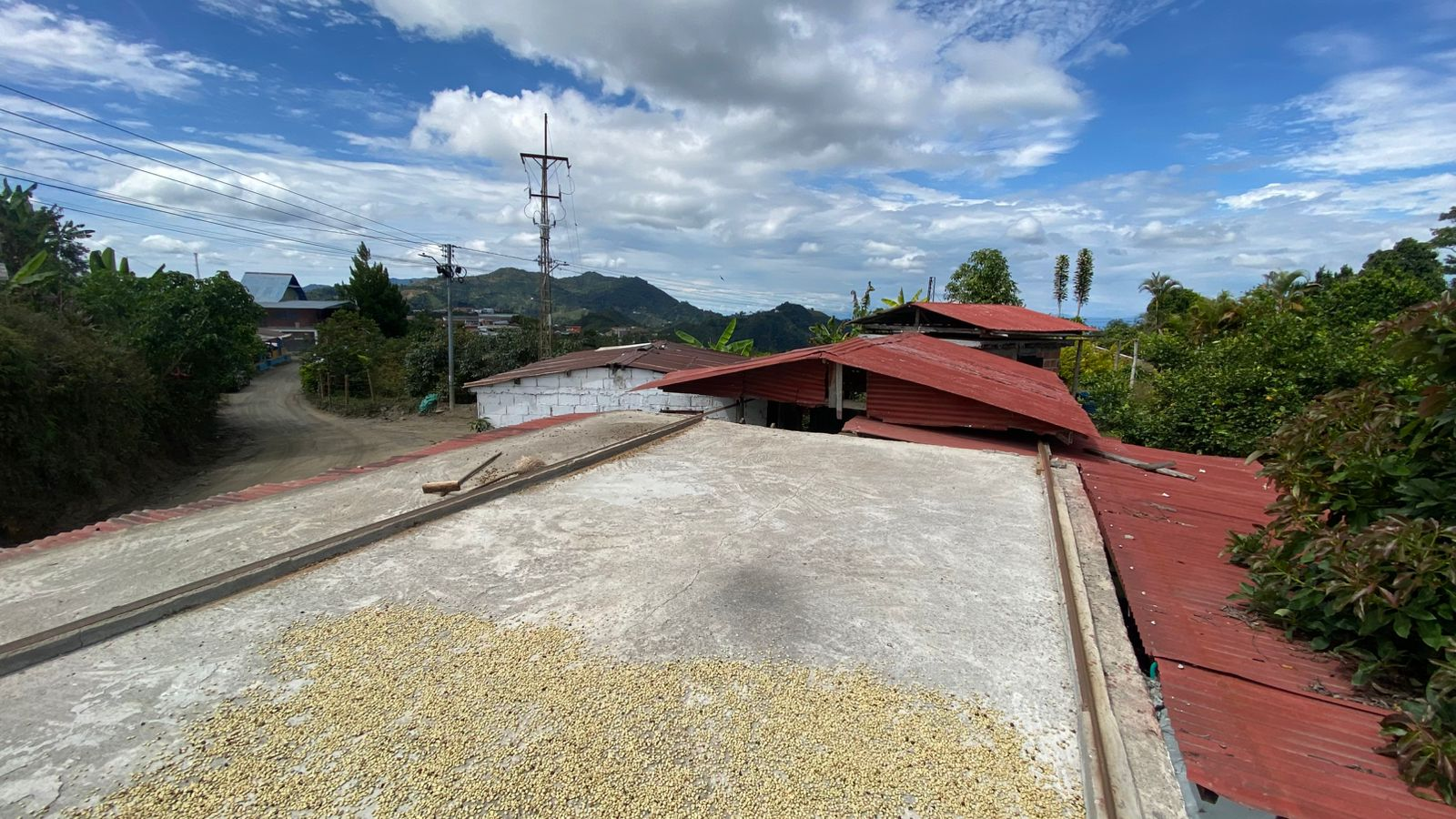
Traditional house with a movable roof called casa helda where coffee is laid to dry in the open air.

Marquetalia celebrated its first ever roasted coffee contest during its centennial celebration in October 2024, where 3 out of 15 participating brands were chosen for their quality, whose scores ranged from 84,00 to 85,00 points according to the judges from the National Coffee Federation. This event marked a turning point for Marquetalia, as its focus until recent years had been primarily on the production of raw coffee.

Marquetalia's difficult terrain has also given way to both the arriero and the yipao subcultures, the first one being the name of the mover of goods atop mules and horses between commercial centers before the arrival of motor vehicles, and the second being the name of the widespread use of Jeeps and other high-torque car brands that made transportation of people and goods possible along the unpaved roads of the region of the 20th century. Yipaos are still widely used for local and intermunicipal transportation and both are cultural markers of the Paisa people.

== Subdivisions ==
The municipality of Marquetalia is divided in two administrative regions: Marquetalia and the Corregimiento of Santa Elena. This Corregimiento was established by municipal decree on December 12, 1990. Apart from the town of Marquetalia, there are 48 subdivisions, or veredas, in total:

Marquetalia (33 veredas):

Alegrías Alto, Alegrías Bajo, Buenos Aires, Campo Alegre, Costa Rica, Cúcuta, El Aguacate, El Chocó, El Placer, El Porvenir, Encimadas, La Bamba, La Esmeralda, La Estrella, La Florida, La Maporita, La Miel, La Palma, La Parda, La Playa, La Quiebra, El Rosal, La Tebaida, Las Gaviotas, Lituania, Los Zainos, Patiobonito, San Gregorio, San Juan, San Luis, Unión Alta, Unión Baja and Unión Esperanza.

Santa Elena (15 veredas):

Altobonito, El Palmar, El Retiro, El Rosario, El Vergel, Gancho, Guacas, Guarinó-Guamo, Guarinó-San Roque, La Bella, La Mirla, La Moscovita, San Pablo, San Roque and Santa Elena.

== Celebrations ==
- Exposición Equina-Grado B - B-grade equine expo. Yearly in September.
- Fiestas de la Cordillera - Folk festival. Biennal. Celebrated in October on even years.
- Fiestas del Árbol - Folk festival. Celebrated in the Corregimiento of Santa Helena every two years in October.
- Semana Santa (Holy Week or easter) - Catholic celebration. Celebrated at the beginning of April.

== See also ==
- Samaná, Caldas
- Victoria, Colombia
- Manzanares, Caldas
- Paisa people
- Yipao
- Cordillera Central (Colombia)
- Colombian coffee growing axis
- Biodiversity of Colombia
