= Marquetalia =

Marquetalia may refer to:

- Marquetalia, Caldas, a town and municipality in Colombia
- Marquetalia Republic, a term used to unofficially refer to one of the enclaves in rural Colombia which Communist peasant guerrillas held during the aftermath of "La Violencia"
