= Jhonny Rivera =

Colombian singer (born 1974)

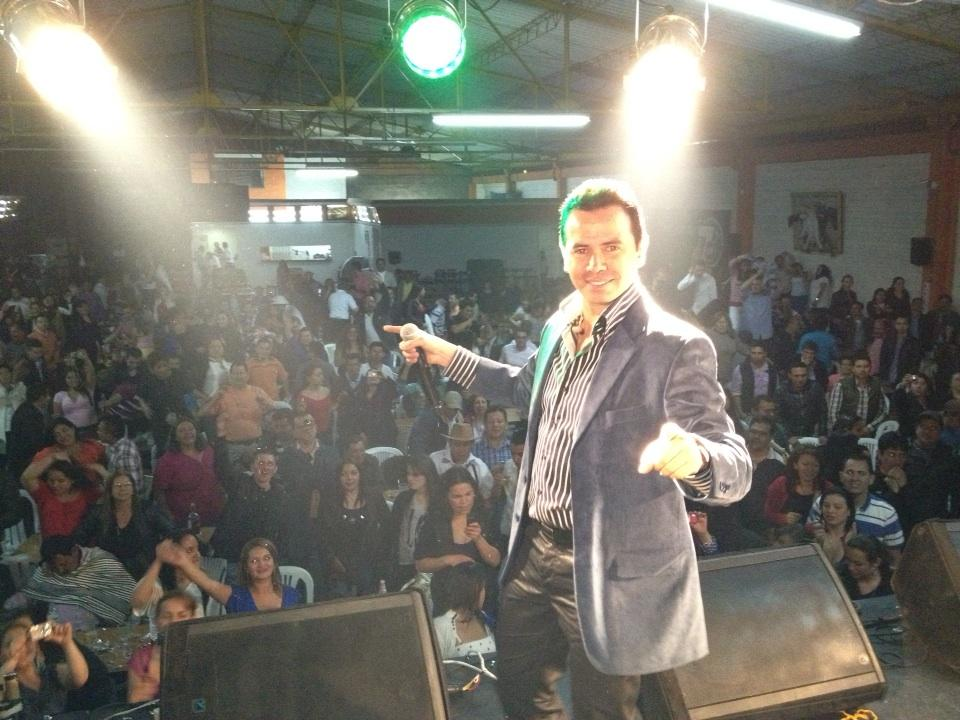
- Jhonny Rivera

Background information
- Born: Jhon Jairo Rivera Valencia; February 23, 1974 (age 52); Pereira, Colombia
- Genre: Ranchera
- Years active: 2004–present
- Website: www.jhonnyrivera.net

Jhonny Rivera (born February 23, 1974) is a Colombian popular music singer, actor and businessman.

== Biography ==
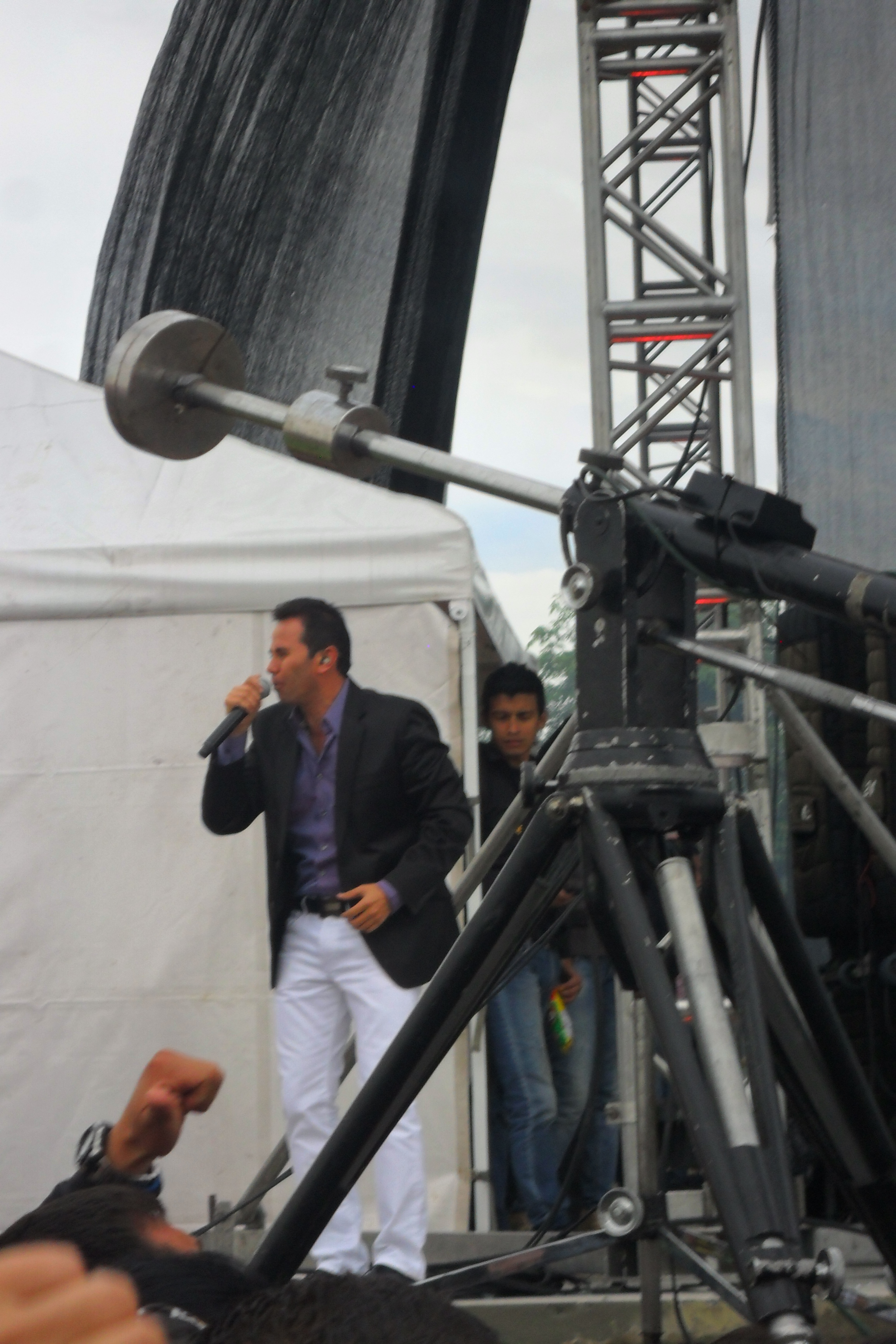
Jhonny Rivera concert

Jhon Jairo Rivera Valencia was born on February 23, 1974 in the city of Pereira, Colombia.

A broken heart led him to compose his first release The Pain of A Game, followed by others, including I'm Single and Best Sólito, with which he garnered a local regional recognition titled Premios Nuestra Tierra a Best Tropical Song.

He has made more than twelve tours, including to Spain, Ecuador, United States, Venezuela and Aruba.

In the 2009 he relaunched his career with a tropical song titled "The Shy" which is somewhat popular on YouTube.

In 2010 he released My Only Treasure with J Balvin. At the beginning of 2012 her new album Te Sigo Wanting contains the song For A Beer. He also made a bachata with his son Andy Rivera entitled "The Pay That Makes" after premieres "The Pegao" which received a local recognition titled Feria de Cali.

In 2015, this artist promoted a new song Por Andar Enamorao.

He has been making more music since then.

== Personal life ==
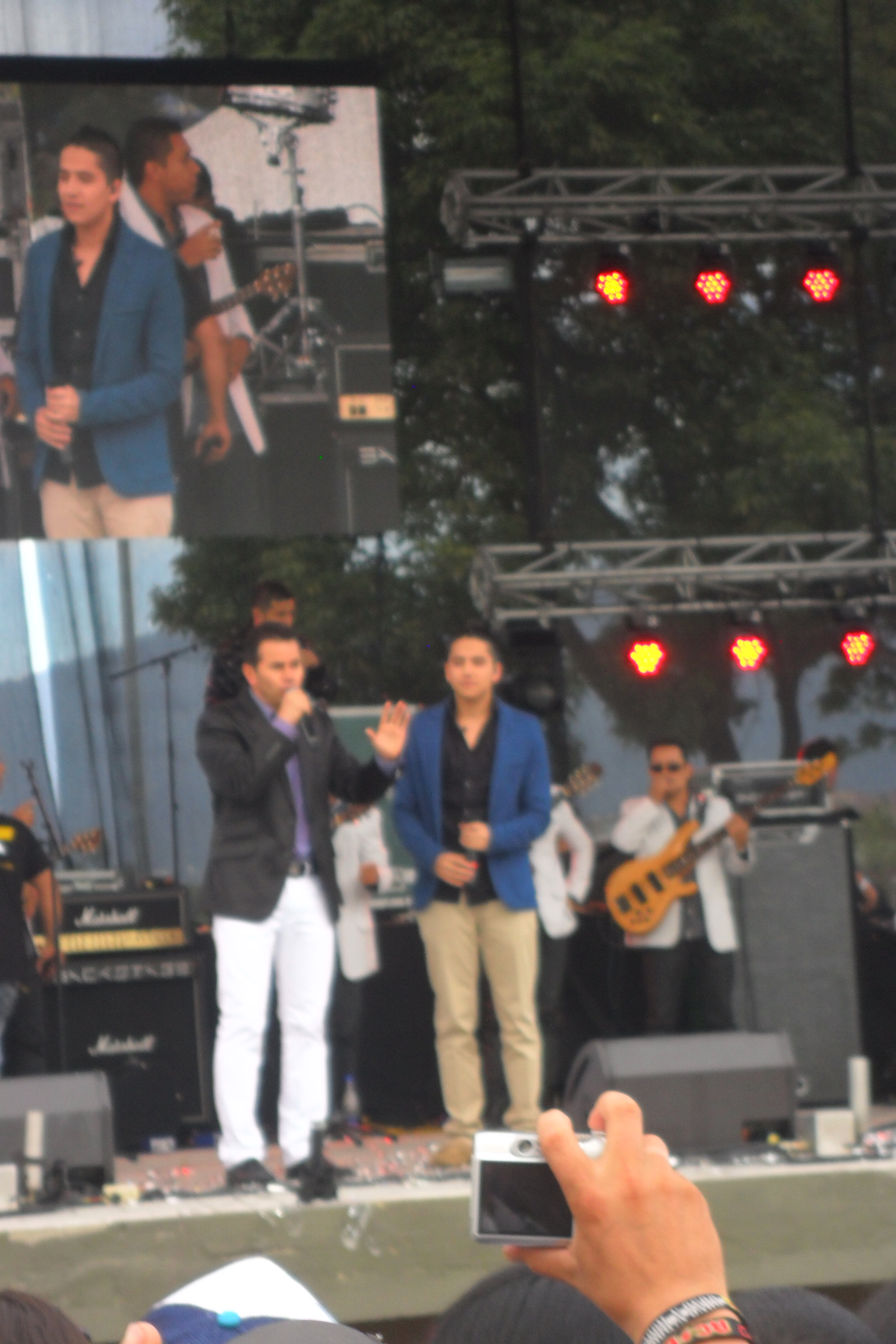
Jhonny and his son Andy Rivera

Jhon Jairo Rivera Valencia was born in Pereira, Colombia, to parents Maria Mabel Valencia and Jose Oscar Rivera, and his brothers Juliet, Luz Piedad and Oscar Mario.

At 17, he left Pereira to Bogotá, where he had a very difficult time getting a job. His girlfriend at the time went to live with him and they had a son. She later left to go to Spain with their son. He says this was one of the most difficult moments of his life and had contemplated suicide . He returned to his home in Pereira where he had the opportunity to write and record a song which sent him to success. His son Andy Rivera returned from Spain and followed in his footsteps as a successful singer in the urban genre .

== Filmography ==
Year	Title	Role
2013	Head	Guest (1 episode) singing 'Let Me Blow Son Al Bailo' with Pipe Bueno
2010	The Snitch Cartel	Antonio Villegas
2008	Nobody is eternal in the World	Guest

== Collaborations ==
- Let's start Zero (feat. Lady Yuliana)
- Por Que Se Fue (feat. Charrito Negro)
- Se Que Te Falle (feat. Lady Yuliana)
- My Only Treasure (feat. J Balvin)
- Jealousy "Live" (feat. Fanny Lu)
- Love and Spite (feat. Jhon Alex Castaño)
- Al Bailo Son Que Me Blow (feat. Pipe Bueno)
- Did They Do not exchange (feat. Yolanda del Rio)
- Papi (feat. Ricardo Torres and his Mariachi)
- The Pay ago That (feat. Andy Rivera)
- El Tiempo Dira Quien Miente (feat. Lady Yuliana)
- Me Voy A Casar (feat. Darío Gómez)
- Ser Colombiano Es Un Lujo (feat. El Orejón)
- Así Es La Vida (feat. Mauro Ayala)
- Como Duele (feat. Los Hermanos Medina)
- Comamos Sano (feat. Mauricio López)
- Siga Bebiendo (feat. Yeison Jiménez)
- Como Una Pelota (feat. Espinoza Paz)

== Label ==
- Ya No Dudes De Mi (2004)
- Soy Soltero (2006)
- Solo Exito (2007)
- Una Voz Que Llega A Alma (2007)
- El Intenso (2008)
- Tengo Rabia Con migo (2010)
- Te Sigo Queriendo (2012)
- No Hay Porque Esperar (2014)

== See also ==
- Vallenato
