= Sugamuxi (disambiguation) =

Sugamuxi may refer to:

- Sugamuxi, last iraca of Sugamuxi, Colombia
- Sogamoso, modern name of Suamox, seat of Sugamuxi
- Sugamuxi Province, the province of which Sogamoso is the capital
