= Música popular =

Música popular (Spanish and Portuguese for popular music) may refer to:

- Música popular brasileira, a style of bossa nova from Brazil
- Música popular (Colombia), a music genre from Colombia
