= Nompanim =

- Iraca
- Predecessor: "Bermejo"
- Successor: Sugamuxi
- Born: unknown Muisca Confederation
- Died: unknown Muisca Confederation

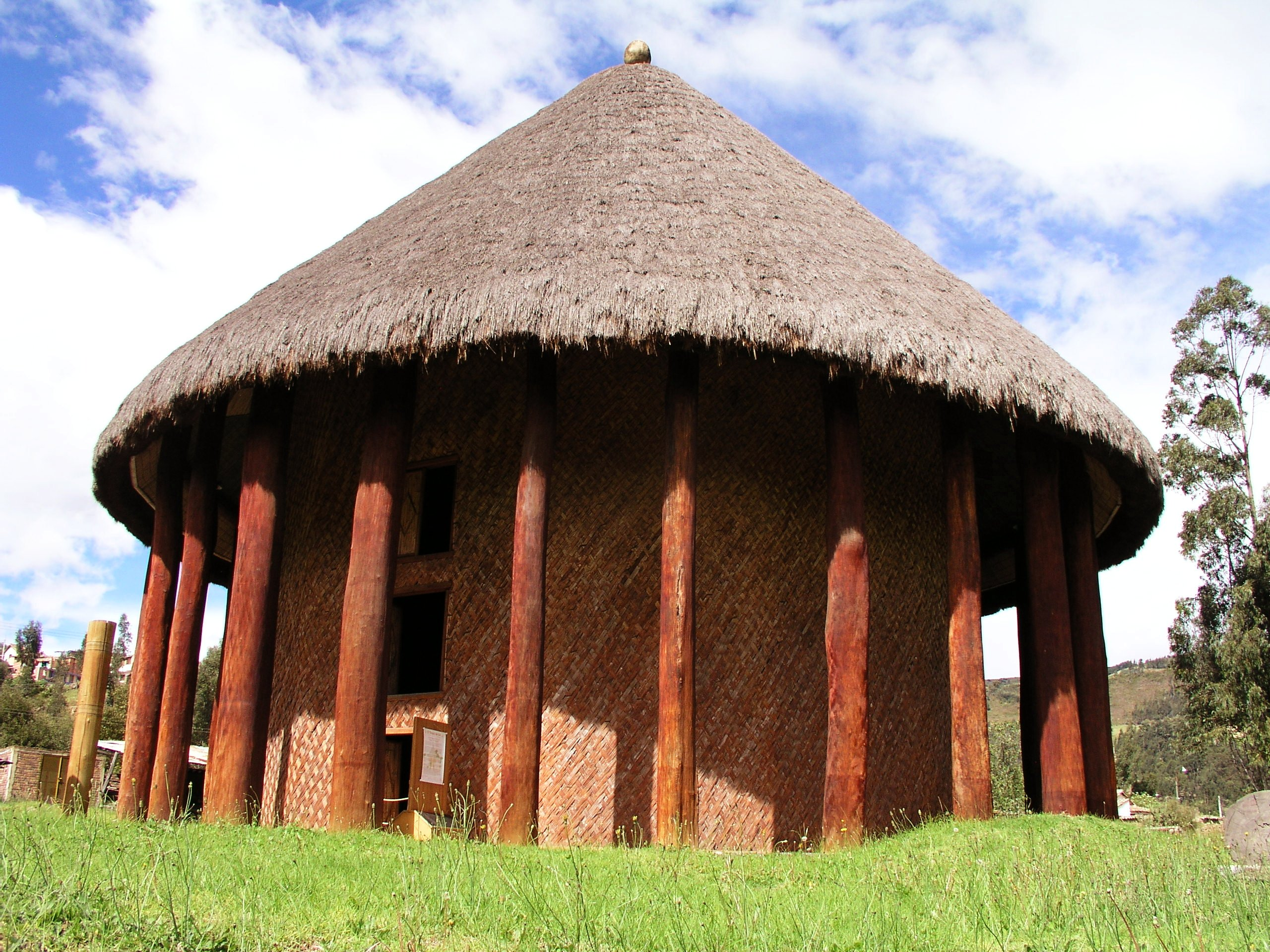
The (reconstructed) Sun Temple in Sugamuxi; seat of Nompanim

Nompanim or Nomparem (Chibcha: "Vessel of the jaguar") (15th century - first third of 16th century) was the penultimate iraca; cacique of the sacred City of the Sun; Sugamuxi. Sugamuxi, presently called Sogamoso, was an important city in the religion of the Muisca who inhabited the Altiplano Cundiboyacense in the times before the Spanish conquest of the Muisca conquistadores reached the central highlands of the Colombian Andes. Fellow Muisca rulers of other territories within the Muisca Confederation were Tundama in Tundama, zaque Quemuenchatocha in Hunza and zipas Nemequene and Tisquesusa in Bacatá.

== Biography ==
According to the traditions of the northern Muisca, the iraca of Sugamuxi was chosen alternating between the caciques of Firavitoba and Tobasía. Nompanim, from Tobasía, was the successor of Bermejo (Spanish given name), as cacique of Sugamuxi. Bermejo was an usurper to the throne of Sugamuxi, allegedly because he was a redhead. Nompanim supported zaque Quemuenchatocha with an army of 20,000 guecha warriors in the Battle of Los Arroyos against zipa Nemequene, fought around 1514. The army of the zaque, supported by Nompanim, Tundama, and the caciques of Gámeza and Sáchica won this battle and Nemequene died the next day, succeeded by Tisquesusa.

The seat of Nompanim was the Sun Temple in Sogamoso, that was destroyed by soldiers of Gonzalo Jiménez de Quesada in September 1537.

Nompanim installed four new laws for his people: 1; don't kill, 2; don't steal, 3; don't lie and 4; don't take someone else's wife. The first crime was punished with the death penalty and for the other crimes lashing was the punishment at the first incident, personal dishonouring for the second and inherited dishonouring for the third time.

Nompanim died in an unknown year shortly after 1514 and was succeeded by Sugamuxi, the last iraca of the City of the Sun, who confronted the Spanish conquerors and converted to catholicism.

=== Nompanim in Muisca history ===
History of the Muisca
Altiplano	Muisca	Art	Architecture	Astronomy	Cuisine	El Dorado	Subsistence	Women	Conquest

== See also ==
- Sun Temple, iraca, Code of Nemequene
