= Paola Jara =

Colombian singer

- Jara in 2022

Background information
- Born: Paula Andrea Zapata Jaramillo; Apartadó, Antioquia Department, Colombia
- Genres: Latin; ranchera; música popular
- Occupation: Singer

Paula Andrea Zapata Jaramillo is a Colombian singer. She was nominated for a Grammy Award in the category Best Música Mexicana Album for the album Sin Rodeos.
