= Yeison Jiménez =

Colombian singer (1991–2026)

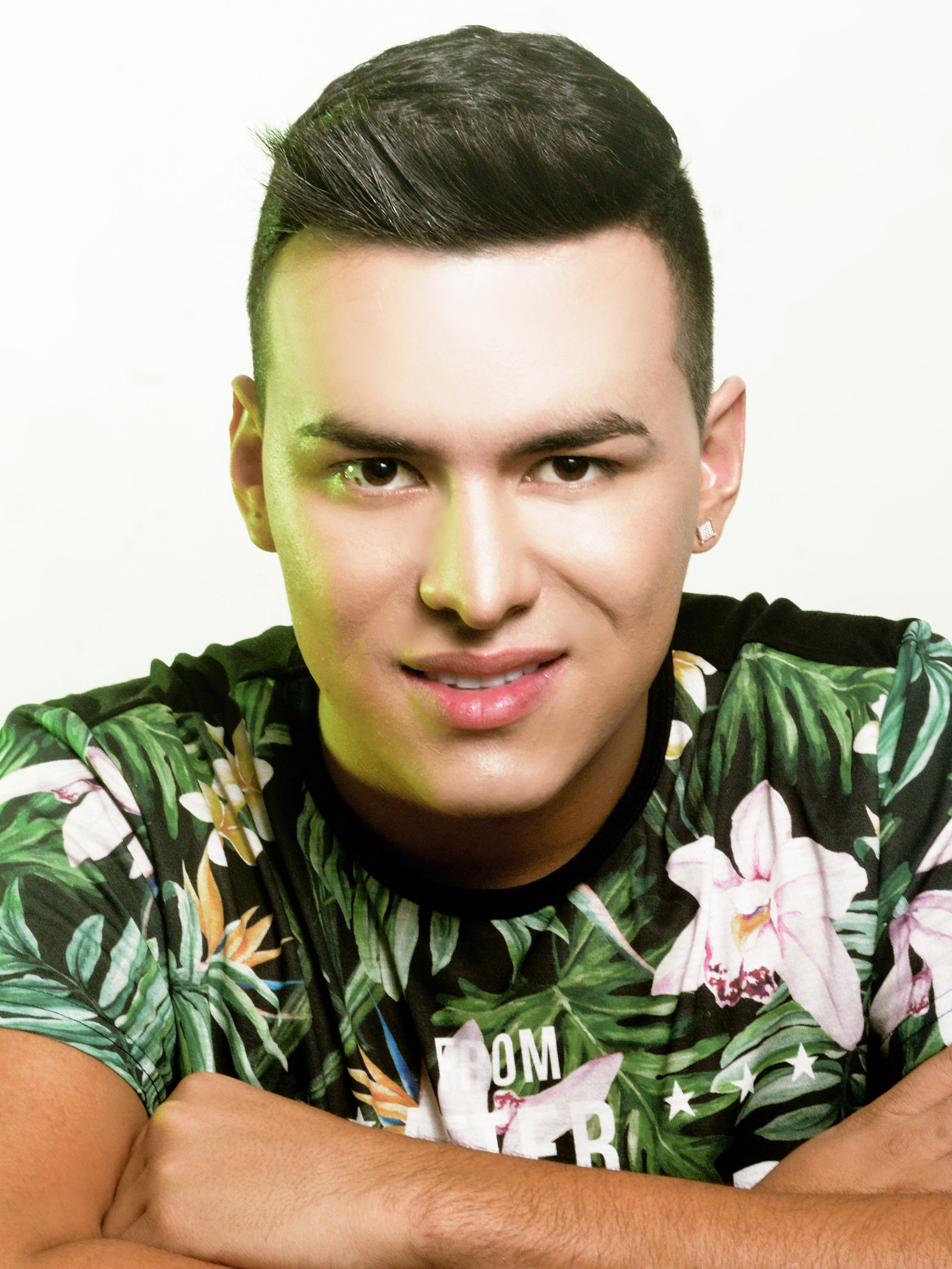
- Jiménez in 2016
- Born: Yeison Orlando Jiménez Galeano; 26 July 1991; Manzanares, Caldas, Colombia
- Died: 10 January 2026 (aged 34); Paipa, Boyacá, Colombia
- Occupation: Singer
- Years active: 2001–2026
- Website: yeisonjimenez.com

Yeison Orlando Jiménez Galeano (Latin American Spanish pronunciation: [ˈɟʝejson xiˈmenes]; 26 July 1991 – 10 January 2026) was a Colombian singer of música popular.

Jiménez was one of the most well-known artists of música popular, publishing eight albums and writing 70 songs. He was the first singer of the genre to sell out tickets for a solo show at the Movistar Arena of Bogotá in 2024, with Blu Radio crediting him with making the genre mainstream.

== Early years ==
Yeison Jiménez was born in Manzanares, Caldas, on 26 July 1991 to a wealthy father, with both his parents being heavy alcoholics. Jiménez started singing at age seven, participating in singing contests in Caldas during his childhood. His parents broke up during his childhood after Orlando (Yeison's father) met a woman different from Luz Mery Galeano (Yeison's mother) and after Galeano suffered from domestic abuse from Orlando. Galeano escaped from Orlando's house and moved to the house of one of her sisters in Manizales, the capital of Caldas. Later, according to Yeison and his family, Orlando drained his own wealth.

During his teenage years, Galeano moved with Yeison and his sister to Bogotá, Colombia's capital, following a suggestion from Galeano's then-boyfriend, who abandoned them a week after the move. In Bogotá, Jiménez started writing songs and working at Corabastos, Bogotá's main wholesale market. During this time, he struggled with drug addiction (to the point he suffered a stroke), a life of crime for which he served a sentence in house arrest, as well as an alcoholism problem that ran through his family.

== Career ==
At 17, Jiménez started to dedicate himself to his music career full-time. His first commercial song was the 2013 song Te Deseo Lo Mejor, released for the album "Con El Corazón: Vol. 1".

In 2021, he was a member of the jury on the musical program Yo Me Llamo in its eighth season on the Caracol Televisión channel.

== Plane crash and death ==
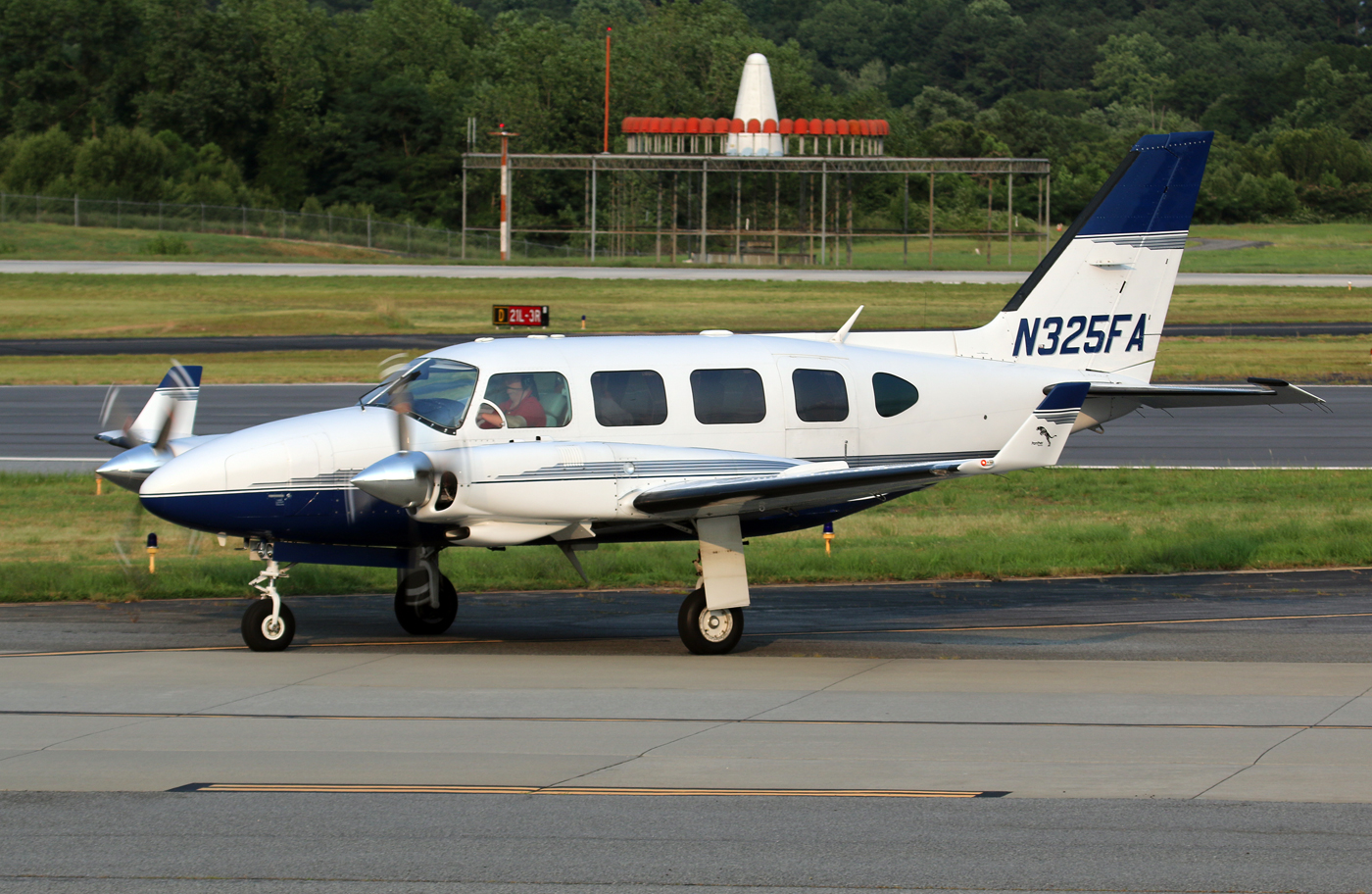
The plane involved in the crash

A Piper PA-31-325 Navajo carrying Jiménez and five others crashed on 10 January 2026 whilst heading from Juan José Rondón Airport, Paipa, to Olaya Herrera Airport, Medellín, for a concert Jiménez was due to perform that evening in Marinilla. The aircraft required more time than usual to start its engines and was delayed before taking off. After taking off the Navajo failed to gain altitude, quickly turning right on a 290° heading. The aircraft crashed into a farm field, just under 2 km from the end of the runway, killing all on board, including Jiménez. Police, the fire service, Civil Defence personnel and the Technical Corps of Criminal Judicial Investigation attended the scene.

The Colombian Ministry of Transport launched an investigation into the crash. The Technical Directorate for Accident Investigation, the Civil Aviation Authority (Aerocivil), the Bogotá search and rescue centre, and the national police are also investigating. A preliminary report by Aerocivil was published on 28 January 2026.
