= Fresno, Tolima =

Fresno
- Municipality and town
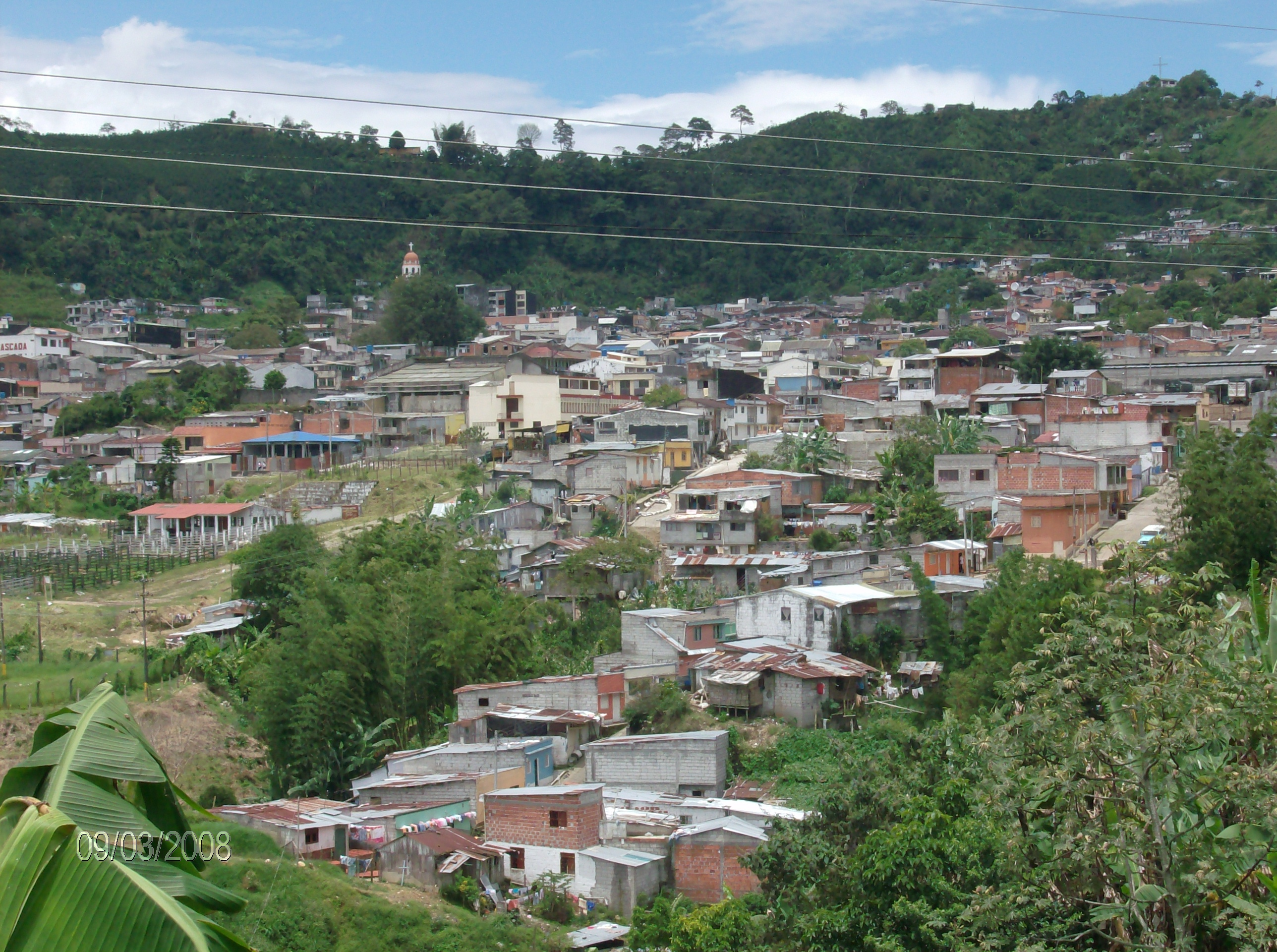
- View of Fresno, Tolima

- Flag Coat of arms

- Location of the municipality and town of Fresno in the Tolima Department of Colombia
- Coordinates: 5°09′20″N 75°02′25″W
- Country: Colombia
- Department: Tolima Department
- Founded: 1574
- Founder: Gonzalo Jiménez de Quesada

Government
  - Mayor: Carlos Andrés Cárdenas Hurtado

Area
  - Total: 208 km^{2} (80 sq mi)
- Elevation: 1,465 m (4,806 ft)

Population (Census 2018)
  - Total: 28,920
  - Density: 139/km^{2} (360/sq mi)
- Demonym: Fresnese
- Time zone: UTC-5 (Colombia Standard Time)
- Website: Official website (in Spanish)

Fresno is a town and municipality in the Tolima department of Colombia. It is located 142 kilometres (88 mi) from Ibagué. It was founded in 1574 by Gonzalo Jiménez de Quesada. The population of the municipality was 28,920 as of the 2018 census.

== Climate ==
Climate data for Fresno/Manzanares (Llanadas), elevation 1,420 m (4,660 ft), (1971–2000)
Month	Jan	Feb	Mar	Apr	May	Jun	Jul	Aug	Sep	Oct	Nov	Dec	Year
Mean daily maximum °C (°F)	24.7 (76.5)	25.0 (77.0)	25.1 (77.2)	25.6 (78.1)	26.0 (78.8)	26.4 (79.5)	26.9 (80.4)	26.6 (79.9)	25.9 (78.6)	25.0 (77.0)	24.8 (76.6)	24.5 (76.1)	25.5 (77.9)
Daily mean °C (°F)	19.4 (66.9)	19.6 (67.3)	19.6 (67.3)	19.9 (67.8)	20.2 (68.4)	20.5 (68.9)	20.4 (68.7)	20.1 (68.2)	19.8 (67.6)	19.4 (66.9)	19.5 (67.1)	19.4 (66.9)	19.8 (67.6)
Mean daily minimum °C (°F)	15.5 (59.9)	15.6 (60.1)	15.7 (60.3)	15.9 (60.6)	15.9 (60.6)	15.5 (59.9)	15.3 (59.5)	15.2 (59.4)	15.4 (59.7)	15.3 (59.5)	15.4 (59.7)	15.1 (59.2)	15.5 (59.9)
Average precipitation mm (inches)	156.4 (6.16)	197.1 (7.76)	251.6 (9.91)	324.7 (12.78)	316.6 (12.46)	152.0 (5.98)	132.1 (5.20)	171.6 (6.76)	283.1 (11.15)	349.9 (13.78)	279.3 (11.00)	192.7 (7.59)	2,807.1 (110.52)
Average precipitation days	17	17	21	22	23	14	12	15	19	24	23	17	225
Average relative humidity (%)	82	82	82	82	80	78	75	75	79	83	82	82	80
Mean monthly sunshine hours	124.0	107.4	105.4	108.0	130.2	132.0	167.4	158.1	141.0	117.8	111.0	111.6	1,513.9
Mean daily sunshine hours	4.0	3.8	3.4	3.6	4.2	4.4	5.4	5.1	4.7	3.8	3.7	3.6	4.1
Source: Instituto de Hidrologia Meteorologia y Estudios Ambientales
