= Victoria, Colombia =

Victoria, Caldas
- Municipality and town
- Flag Coat of arms

- Location of the municipality and town of Victoria, Caldas in the Caldas Department of Colombia.

- Location in Colombia
- Coordinates: 5°18′59″N 74°54′45″W
- Country: Colombia
- Department: Caldas Department
- Time zone: UTC-5 (Colombia Standard Time)

Victoria is a town and municipality in the Colombian Department of Caldas.
