= Andy Rivera =

Colombian singer-songwriter (born 1994)

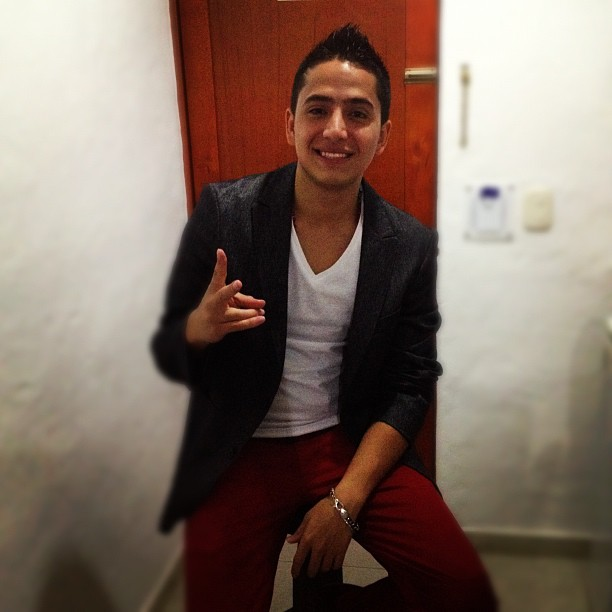
- Rivera in 2012

Background information
- Born: Andrés Felipe Rivera Galeano; October 28, 1994 (age 31); Pereira, Colombia genre =: Reguetón; Pop latino; Trap latino
- Occupations: Singer; songwriter
- Years active: 2012–presente
- Website: www.andyriveramusic.com

Andrés Felipe Rivera Galeano (born October 28, 1994), known professionally as Andy Rivera, is a Colombian singer and songwriter.

== Career ==
Andrés Felipe Rivera Galeano was born in Pereira, Colombia. He is the son of Colombian singer Jhonny Rivera and Luz Galeano. He started following his musical career with his dad at the age of 12, in his free time he dedicated himself to vocalization and playing the piano.

Being a musician himself, Rivera’s father urged him to pursue a “proper” singing career, with Rivera instead gravitating towards reggaetón and urbano music, which was becoming more widespread in the early 2010s. In March 2012, he released his first song, "En Busca Con Ella", with friend and fellow Colombian artist Pipe Calderon and produced by DJ Cano.

By July 2012, Rivera started earning fame throughout Latin America with his hit "Te Pintaron Pajaritos" (featuring Yandar & Yostin). The music video has 97 million views on YouTube, as of January 2024. The song brought Rivera notoriety in countries such as Argentina, Chile, Spain, Ecuador, Venezuela and Perú, in addition to his native Colombia.

In October 2012, after the success of "Te Pintaron Pajaritos", Rivera released the song "Por Todo Me Peleas", which was only a moderate success. He then appeared on a remix with Riko El Monumental and kept making his own music. In November 2012, he released the single "Si Me Necesitas", which also received a lukewarm response; however, after teaming up with Puerto Rican duo Baby Rasta & Gringo to record a new remix, the song would become an instant hit.

Rivera experienced newfound success in his career in April 2013 with the release of the song "Los Perros se Enamoran" (featuring Nicky Jam). A follow-up single, “Espina de Rosa” (featuring Dalmata), was released later that same year, and was an even bigger hit than the previous song, gaining over 167 million views on YouTube (as of 2024). The song itself topped the music charts of many Spanish-speaking countries.

In 2014, Rivera was featured on "Salgamos", alongside Kevin Roldan and Maluma. The music video for the song, (as of 2024) has over 459 million views on YouTube, one of Rivera’s most well-known appearances on any song.

In 2020, he was nominated for (and won) several awards at Colombia’s 2020 Latino Show Awards, including “Best Popular Music Song”, “Song of the Year” and “Best Urban Artist”. He was also nominated for several awards at the Premios Nuestra Tierra.

== Discography ==
=== Albums ===
- 2016: The New Age
- 2017: Substance EP
- 2019: 50/50
- 2022: DUAL EP

=== Collaborations ===
- Dejemos Todo Atrás (Ft. Valeria Celis)
- Te Pintaron Pajaritos (Ft. Yandar & Yostin)
- No Es Normal (Ft. Dayme & El High & Justin Quiles)
- Miénteme (Remix) (Ft. Fontta & Fullbeta)
- Por Todo Me Peleas (remix) (Ft. Riko "El Monumental")
- Si Me Necesitas (remix) (Ft. Baby Rasta & Gringo)
- Los Perros Se Enamoran (Ft. Nicky Jam)
- Los Perros Se Enamoran (remix) (Ft. Nicky Jam, Kevin Roldán, Jowell & Randy, Kafu Banton, Gotay & Ronald El Killa)
- Duele Saber (Ft. Yelsid)
- Hagamos El Amor (Remix) (Ft. Los del Pentagono)
- Espina De Rosa (Ft. Dalmata)
- Salgamos (Ft. Kevin Roldán & Maluma)
- El Que la Hace la Paga (Ft. Johnny Rivera)
- Mañana (Ft. Karol G)
- Dime (Ft. Karol G)
- Ya No Eres (Ft. Andrew)
- No Hay Razón Para Odiarte (Remix) (Ft. Yelsid & Dario Gómez)
- La Máscara (Ft. Ale Mendoza)
- Stripper (Ft. Noriel)
- llego la hora (Ft. Mario Hart)
- Lejania (Remix) (Ft. Ryan Castro, Kevin Roldán, Mackie y Ben3detti)
- Mi Decisión (Remix) (Ft. Jhonny Rivera, Sebastián Ayala)
- 5 Sentíos (Fr. India Martínez)
- Que Vuelta (Ft. SOG, Maxiolly)
- La Rompecorazones (Remix) (Ft. La Banda del 5, Dekko y Alberto Kammerer)
- Arroba (Ft. Kim Loaiza)
- En Todas Partes (Ft. Onikx, Kapo)

== Awards and nominations ==
| Year | Award | Nominated work | Category | Result |
|---|---|---|---|---|
| 2013 | Premios Nuestra Tierra | "They Painted Little Birds" ft. Yandar & Yostin | Urban Song of the Year | Winner |
| 2013 | Premios Nuestra Tierra | "They Painted Little Birds" ft. Yandar & Yostin | song of the year | Nominated |
| 2013 | Premios Nuestra Tierra | "They Painted Little Birds" ft. Yandar & Yostin | public song | Nominated |
| 2013 | Premios Nuestra Tierra | Andy Rivera | Best New Artist | Winner |
| 2014 | Premios Nuestra Tierra | Espina de Rosa (ft. Dalmatian ) | Urban Song of the Year | Nominated |
| 2014 | Premios Nuestra Tierra | Espina de Rosa (ft. Dalmatian ) | public song | Nominated |
| 2020 | Premios Nuestra Tierra | Somebody Likes Me (feat. Jhonny Rivera and Jessi Uribe ) | Song of the Year | Nominated |
| 2020 | Premios Nuestra Tierra | Somebody Likes Me (feat. Jhonny Rivera and Jessi Uribe ) | Popular Song of the Year | Nominated |
| 2020 | Premios Nuestra Tierra | Somebody Likes Me (feat. Jhonny Rivera and Jessi Uribe ) | public song | Nominated |
| 2020 | Latino Show Awards 2020 | Somebody Likes Me (feat. Jhonny Rivera and Jessi Uribe ) | best popular music song | Winner |
| 2020 | Latino Show Awards 2020 | Somebody Likes Me (feat. Jhonny Rivera and Jessi Uribe ) | Song of the Year | Winner |
| 2020 | Latino Show Awards 2020 | Andy Rivera | Best Urban Artist | Winner |
