= Óscar Agudelo =

Colombian musician (1932–2023)

- Also known as: El Zorzal Criollo
- Born: 23 September 1932; Herveo, Colombia
- Died: 16 December 2023 (aged 91); Bogotá, Colombia
- Genres: Bolero, Tango, Milonga, Guasca
- Occupation: Musician

Luis Óscar Agudelo Márquez (23 September 1932 – 16 December 2023), popularly known as El Zorzal Criollo, was a Colombian musician. He was acknowledged to be the finest Colombian proponent of la canción sureña.

Agudelo was born in Fresno, Tolima in 1932. He studied in Ibagué, before developing as an artist in Pereira and Medellín. He made his debut in Girardot with the song Hojas de Calendario. There he formed a trio with the musicians Nelson Ibarra and Alfonso Medina, and from 1953 started to record discs. Between 1957 and 1960, he lived in Peru, Chile, Paraguay, Uruguay and Argentina. Although best known for la canción sureña, the tango also formed an important part of his repertory.

Agudelo lived in Bogotá. He died on 16 December 2023, at the age of 91. His health had been deteriorating for a number of months, and he had been suffering from both Parkinson's and Alzheimer's diseases.
