= Música popular (Colombia) =

Colombian music genre

Música popular colombiana
- Stylistic origins: Regional Mexican, Guasca, Música Campesina, Música Montañera
- Cultural origins: Late 1930s, Paisa Region, Colombia
- Typical instruments: Trumpet; guitar; Accordion

Other topics
- Latin music

Within Colombia, the term Música popular (Spanish pronunciation: [ˈmusika popuˈlaɾ], 'popular music') is often used to refer to a folk music genre originated between the 1930s and 1940s in the Paisa Region, in the northwestern part of the country, influenced primarily by Mexican folk music, as well as Argentinian, Ecuadorian and Peruvian to a lesser degree. Eventually it lost these combinations and currently is a mixture of different genres of Regional Mexican.

== History ==
The genre started to develop between the 1930s and 1940s in the Paisa Region (comprising the modern-day departments of Antioquia, Caldas, Quindío and Risaralda), based on Mexican folk music genres such as corrido, huapango and ranchera, as well as on bolero, tango, pasillo and others, which were very popular among campesinos around that time.

The genre started to gain popularity between the late 1940s and the 1950s, when artists such as Óscar Agudelo or Luis Ángel Ramírez started to take off. During that time, the genre was regarded as proper to Colombia's lower class.

During the late 20th century, the most well known genre's artists such as Darío Gómez, El Charrito Negro, Luis Alberto Posada, etc. were being listened all throughout the country's bars. However, the genre started to stall in the early 2000s, given the low number of well-known artists and the aging of the existing ones.

The genre saw a comeback between the late 2000s and the early 2010s, when new artists such as Pipe Bueno, Jhon Álex Castaño or Yeison Jiménez started to appear. It is not exactly known why this increase in popularity occurred. When interviewed by El Colombiano, senior manager of record label Codiscos Álvaro Picón said that Pipe Bueno played a huge roll in the process of the genre's repopularization. He also said that the popularity momentum created by Bueno was then kept by the introduction other new artists who brought the genre to listeners outside of its traditional bar niche. The softening of the lyrics of the genre's songs was also cited as a factor by Picón. He lastly said that additionally, a decline in the popularity of romantic vallenato coinciding with the revival of música popular boosted even more the rise in popularity of the last one.
