= Sugamuxi =

Tribal chief

- Iraca
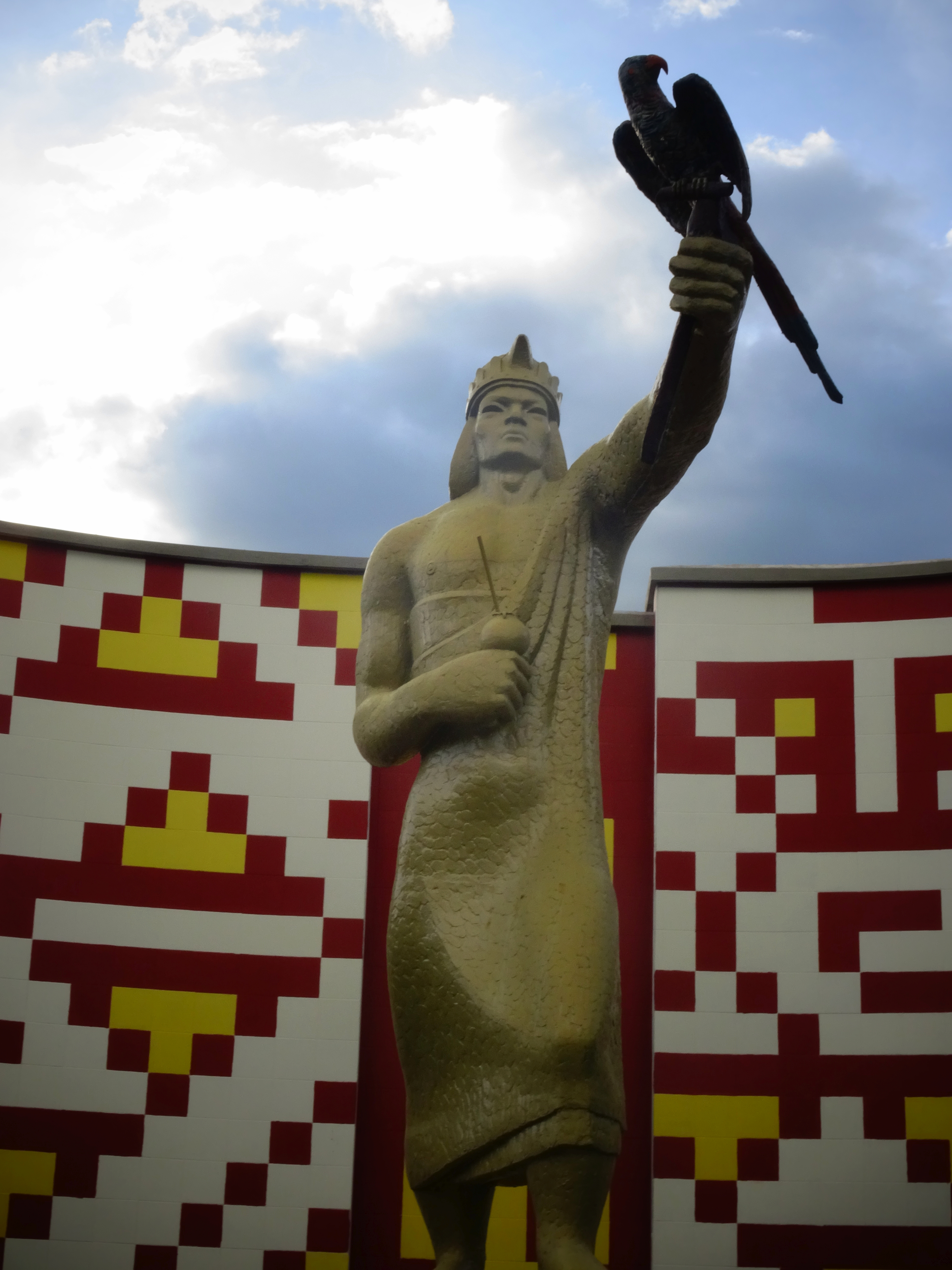
- Statue of Sugamuxi in the Archeological Museum of Sogamoso
- Reign: –1539
- Predecessor: Nompanim
- Successor: Position abolished
- Born: unknown Suamox, Muisca Confederation
- Died: 1539; Sogamoso, New Kingdom of Granada

Sugamuxi (died 1539) was the last iraca; cacique of the sacred City of the Sun Suamox. Sugamuxi, presently called Sogamoso, was an important city in the religion of the Muisca who inhabited the Altiplano Cundiboyacense in the times before the Spanish conquistadors reached the central highlands of the Colombian Andes. Fellow Muisca rulers of other territories within the Muisca Confederation were Tundama in Tundama, zaque Aquiminzaque in Hunza and zipa Sagipa in Bacatá.

== Biography ==
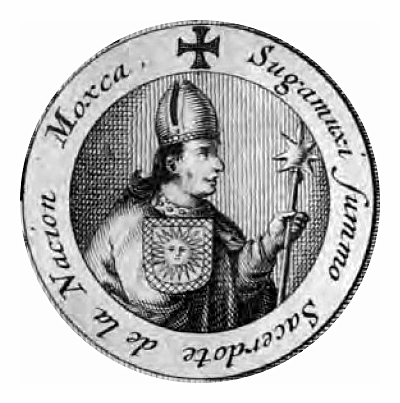
Sugamuxi, the last ruler of Suamox depicted in 1688 by Lucas Fernández de Piedrahita

Sugamuxi was the successor of Nompanim, as cacique of Suamox. After the bloody confrontation of the zaque Quemuenchatocha and zipa Nemequene, Sugamuxi decided to stay neutral and in favour of peace between the two ever battling parts of the Muisca Confederation. The seat of Sugamuxi was the Sun Temple in Sogamoso, that was destroyed by soldiers of Gonzalo Jiménez de Quesada in September 1537.

At the arrival of the Spanish conquerors, Sugamuxi converted to catholicism and was called Don Alonso. He died shortly afterwards.

=== Sugamuxi in Muisca history ===
History of the Muisca
Altiplano	Muisca	Art	Architecture	Astronomy	Cuisine	El Dorado	Subsistence	Women	Conquest

== See also ==
- Spanish conquest of the Muisca
- Sun Temple, iraca
