= Pensilvania, Caldas =

- Municipality and town
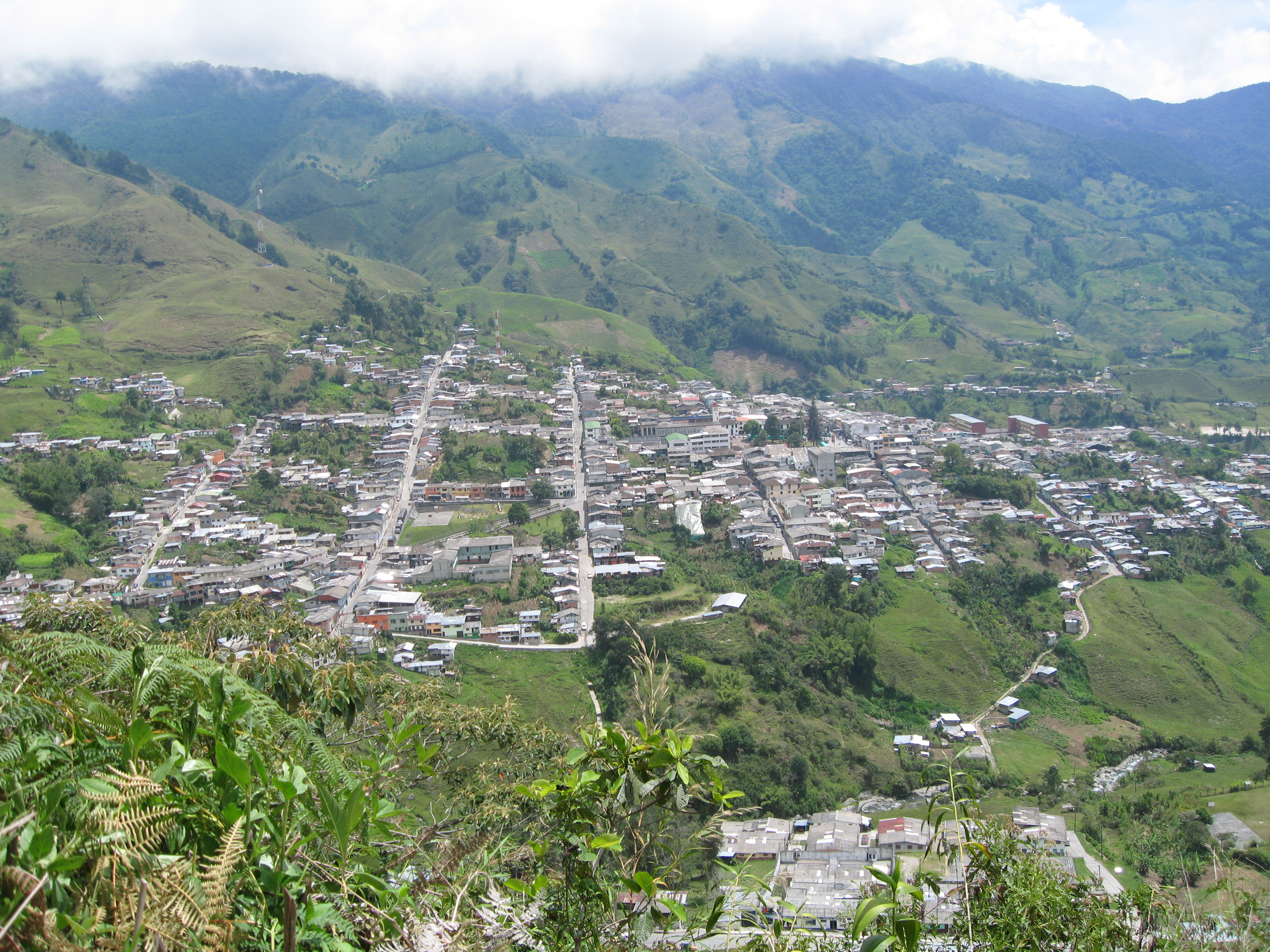
- View of Pensilvania, Caldas

- Flag Coat of arms

- Location of the municipality and town of Pensilvania, Caldas in the Caldas Department of Colombia.

- Location in Colombia
- Coordinates: 5°23′1″N 75°9′48″W
- Country: Colombia
- Department: Caldas Department

Area
  - Municipality and town: 530 km^{2} (200 sq mi)
- Elevation: 2,050 m (6,730 ft)

Population (2025)
  - Municipality and town: 20 50
  - Urban: 9,161
- Time zone: UTC-5 (Colombia Standard Time)

Pensilvania (Spanish for Pennsylvania) is a town and municipality in the Colombian Department of Caldas.

== Climate ==
Pensilvania has a subtropical highland climate (Cfb) with heavy to very heavy rainfall year-round.

Climate data for Pensilvania
Month	Jan	Feb	Mar	Apr	May	Jun	Jul	Aug	Sep	Oct	Nov	Dec	Year
Mean daily maximum °C (°F)	20.9 (69.6)	21.2 (70.2)	21.3 (70.3)	20.3 (68.5)	20.7 (69.3)	20.8 (69.4)	21.3 (70.3)	21.1 (70.0)	21.0 (69.8)	20.1 (68.2)	20.1 (68.2)	20.5 (68.9)	20.8 (69.4)
Daily mean °C (°F)	16.6 (61.9)	16.9 (62.4)	17.2 (63.0)	16.6 (61.9)	17.1 (62.8)	16.9 (62.4)	17.0 (62.6)	16.9 (62.4)	16.8 (62.2)	16.3 (61.3)	16.3 (61.3)	16.5 (61.7)	16.8 (62.2)
Mean daily minimum °C (°F)	12.4 (54.3)	12.7 (54.9)	13.1 (55.6)	12.9 (55.2)	13.5 (56.3)	13.1 (55.6)	12.7 (54.9)	12.8 (55.0)	12.6 (54.7)	12.6 (54.7)	12.6 (54.7)	12.5 (54.5)	12.8 (55.0)
Average rainfall mm (inches)	167.7 (6.60)	235.4 (9.27)	304.8 (12.00)	340.6 (13.41)	342.3 (13.48)	199.1 (7.84)	157.9 (6.22)	197.7 (7.78)	301.6 (11.87)	349.5 (13.76)	322.1 (12.68)	210.4 (8.28)	3,129.1 (123.19)
Average rainy days	17	17	21	23	21	14	12	14	19	22	22	19	221
Source 1: IDEAM
Source 2: Climate-Data.org
