= Manzanares, Caldas =

- Municipality and town
- Flag Coat of arms

- Location of the municipality and town of Manzanares, Caldas in the Caldas Department of Colombia.

- Location in Colombia
- Coordinates: 5°15′7″N 75°9′25″W
- Country: Colombia
- Department: Caldas Department
- Elevation: 1,871 m (6,138 ft)

Population (Census 2018)
  - Total: 16,532
- Time zone: UTC-5 (Colombia Standard Time)

Manzanares (Spanish pronunciation: [mansaˈnaɾes]) is a town and municipality in the Colombian Department of Caldas.

== Climate ==
Manzanares has a subtropical highland climate (Köppen Cfb). It has warm afternoons, pleasant mornings, and heavy rainfall year-round.

Climate data for Manzanares (Llanadas), elevation 1,420 m (4,660 ft), (1971–2000)
Month	Jan	Feb	Mar	Apr	May	Jun	Jul	Aug	Sep	Oct	Nov	Dec	Year
Mean daily maximum °C (°F)	24.7 (76.5)	25.0 (77.0)	25.1 (77.2)	25.6 (78.1)	26.0 (78.8)	26.4 (79.5)	26.9 (80.4)	26.6 (79.9)	25.9 (78.6)	25.0 (77.0)	24.8 (76.6)	24.5 (76.1)	25.5 (77.9)
Daily mean °C (°F)	19.4 (66.9)	19.6 (67.3)	19.6 (67.3)	19.9 (67.8)	20.2 (68.4)	20.5 (68.9)	20.4 (68.7)	20.1 (68.2)	19.8 (67.6)	19.4 (66.9)	19.5 (67.1)	19.4 (66.9)	19.8 (67.6)
Mean daily minimum °C (°F)	15.5 (59.9)	15.6 (60.1)	15.7 (60.3)	15.9 (60.6)	15.9 (60.6)	15.5 (59.9)	15.3 (59.5)	15.2 (59.4)	15.4 (59.7)	15.3 (59.5)	15.4 (59.7)	15.1 (59.2)	15.5 (59.9)
Average precipitation mm (inches)	156.4 (6.16)	197.1 (7.76)	251.6 (9.91)	324.7 (12.78)	316.6 (12.46)	152.0 (5.98)	132.1 (5.20)	171.6 (6.76)	283.1 (11.15)	349.9 (13.78)	279.3 (11.00)	192.7 (7.59)	2,807.1 (110.52)
Average precipitation days	17	17	21	22	23	14	12	15	19	24	23	17	225
Average relative humidity (%)	82	82	82	82	80	78	75	75	79	83	82	82	80
Mean monthly sunshine hours	124.0	107.4	105.4	108.0	130.2	132.0	167.4	158.1	141.0	117.8	111.0	111.6	1,513.9
Mean daily sunshine hours	4.0	3.8	3.4	3.6	4.2	4.4	5.4	5.1	4.7	3.8	3.7	3.6	4.1
Source: Instituto de Hidrologia Meteorologia y Estudios Ambientales

Climate data for Manzanares (Agronomia), elevation 2,150 m (7,050 ft), (1971–2000)
Month	Jan	Feb	Mar	Apr	May	Jun	Jul	Aug	Sep	Oct	Nov	Dec	Year
Mean daily maximum °C (°F)	22.2 (72.0)	22.1 (71.8)	22.0 (71.6)	21.4 (70.5)	21.0 (69.8)	21.1 (70.0)	21.6 (70.9)	21.7 (71.1)	21.3 (70.3)	20.7 (69.3)	21.0 (69.8)	21.5 (70.7)	21.5 (70.7)
Daily mean °C (°F)	17.0 (62.6)	16.9 (62.4)	17.1 (62.8)	16.9 (62.4)	16.7 (62.1)	16.8 (62.2)	17.0 (62.6)	17.0 (62.6)	16.5 (61.7)	16.1 (61.0)	16.3 (61.3)	16.5 (61.7)	16.7 (62.1)
Mean daily minimum °C (°F)	12.8 (55.0)	13 (55)	13.2 (55.8)	13.3 (55.9)	13.3 (55.9)	13.3 (55.9)	13.1 (55.6)	13.2 (55.8)	12.9 (55.2)	12.8 (55.0)	12.8 (55.0)	12.7 (54.9)	13 (55)
Average precipitation mm (inches)	121.1 (4.77)	137.0 (5.39)	165.5 (6.52)	191.4 (7.54)	197.0 (7.76)	103.9 (4.09)	73.1 (2.88)	101.9 (4.01)	153.0 (6.02)	251.6 (9.91)	210.4 (8.28)	138.2 (5.44)	1,844.1 (72.60)
Average precipitation days	15	15	19	22	23	18	15	17	21	24	21	16	228
Average relative humidity (%)	78	78	78	81	82	79	76	75	79	82	82	80	79
Mean monthly sunshine hours	161.2	121.5	120.9	99.0	99.2	114.0	142.6	139.5	114.0	99.2	114.0	142.6	1,467.7
Mean daily sunshine hours	5.2	4.3	3.9	3.3	3.2	3.8	4.6	4.5	3.8	3.2	3.8	4.6	4.0
Source: Instituto de Hidrologia Meteorologia y Estudios Ambientales
