= Luis Lanchero =

Spanish conquistador

- Born: Unknown; Castile
- Died: 1562; Tunja, New Kingdom of Granada
- Other name: Luis Lancheros
- Occupation: Conquistador
- Years active: 1533-1559
- Employer: Spanish Crown
- Known for: Spanish conquest of the Muzo; Foundation of Muzo, Boyacá
- Spouse(s): Yes, name not known
- Children: 1 daughter

Luis Lanchero, also known as Luis Lancheros (?, Castile - 1562, Tunja, New Kingdom of Granada) was a Spanish conquistador and the founder of the town of Trinidad de los Muzos, Boyacá, the most important emerald settlement in Colombia. Muzo was founded after twenty years of unsuccessful attempts to subjugate the Muzo to Spanish rule. Lanchero arrived in the New World in 1533 and died impoverished in Tunja in 1562.

== Biography ==
=== Early career ===
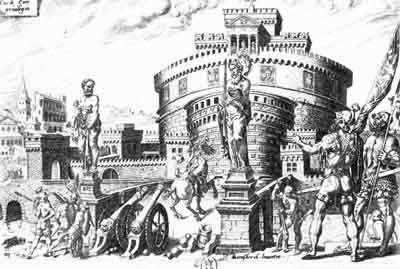
Luis Lanchero participated in the Sack of Rome in 1527

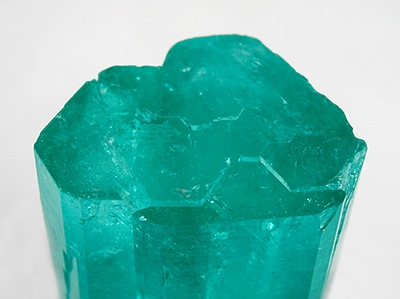
Muzo, founded by Lanchero, is world-famous for its production of emeralds

Luis Lanchero was born in Castile in a noble family. As a young man he was employed in the guard of Spanish king Carlos V, in which role he participated in the Sack of Rome in 1527. In 1533, searching for adventure, Lanchero left Europe for what would later become Venezuela with a conquest expedition led by Jerónimo de Ortal.

=== American expeditions ===
Once there, Lanchero joined the expedition led by Nikolaus Federmann towards the Colombian Andes, reaching the newly founded capital of the New Kingdom of Granada in 1538. He became encomendero of Susa.

When in 1539 Hernán Pérez de Quesada took over the governance of Bogotá from his elder brother and founder Gonzalo Jiménez de Quesada he organised various expeditions in search of valuables and above all for El Dorado. While de Quesada was not satisfied with Lanchero, he was sent towards the territories of the Muzo in western Boyacá in the first months of 1540. Expeditions into Muzo territories were difficult because of the terrain. Due to a lack of food Lanchero's party had to slaughter some horses. After two unsuccessful attempts to subjugate the more than 10,000 Muzo, Lanchero marched through Panche territory to the south, the western portion of the current department of Cundinamarca, back towards Bogotá.

=== Founding of Muzo ===
In early 1559, fifteen years after the discovery of the rich emerald deposits by Diego Martínez, Lanchero returned to Muzo terrain and passed through Maripí. He founded Villa de la Santísima Trinidad de los Muzos, today known as Muzo, on February 20, 1559. On this expedition, Lanchero was accompanied by conquistador Pedro de Ursúa. Muzo was first unsuccessfully founded as Tudela.

During the battles against the Muzo, Lanchero was wounded by an arrow in his chest. In 1560 Lanchero handed the governance of Muzo over to the encomenderos, leading to successive struggles over the rich emerald grounds. On October 17, 1560, Lanchero also passed the control of Curipí to the encomienda.

=== Later career ===
After Miguel Diez de Armendariz took control of the area, Lanchero lost all his possessions. Luis Lanchero died in poverty in Tunja in 1562, leaving a wife and one daughter.

== Conquest by Luis Lanchero ==
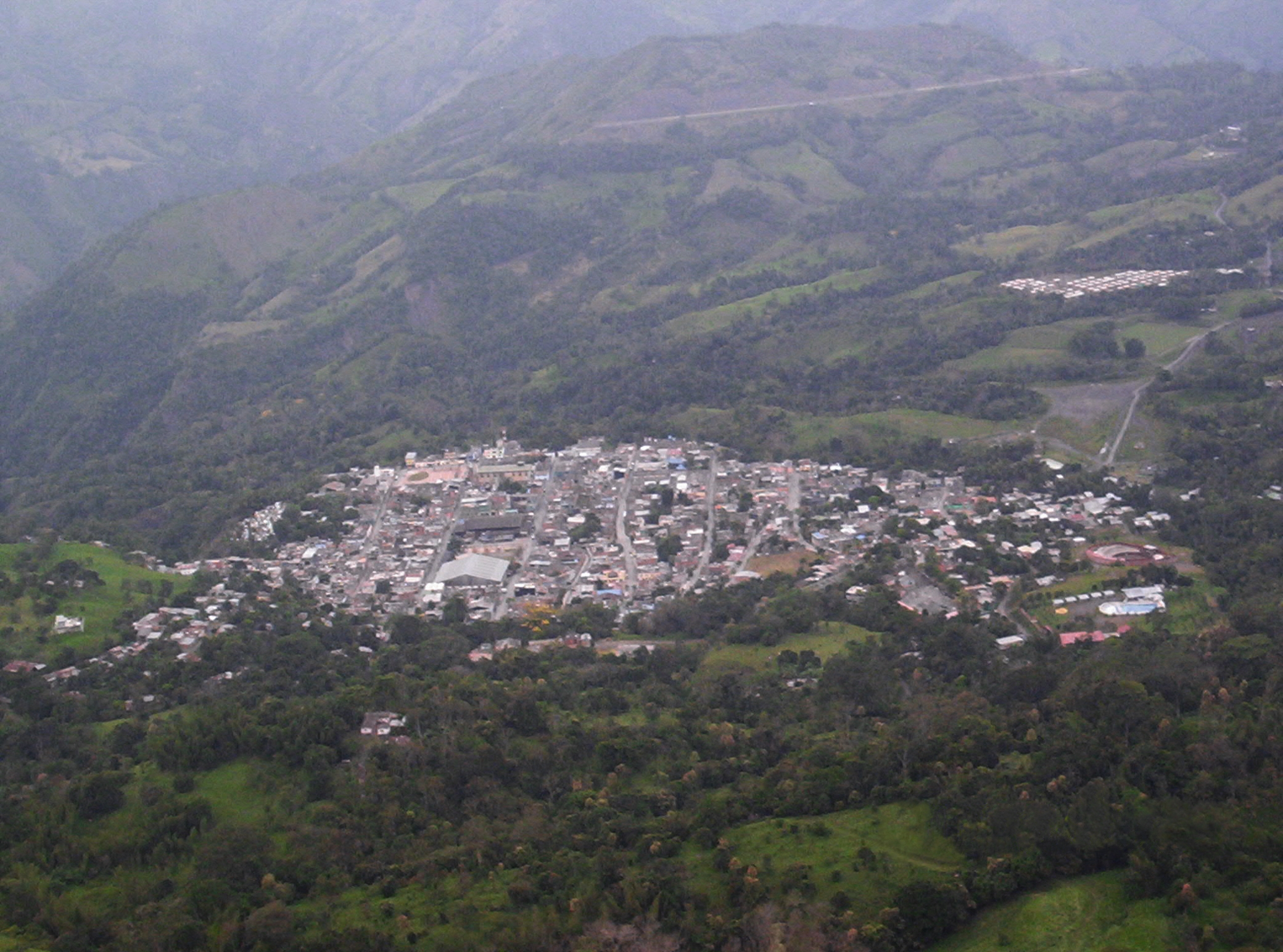
Muzo was founded on February 20, 1559, by Luis Lanchero, accompanied by Pedro de Ursúa

Name bold is founded	Department	Date	Year	Notes	Map
Coper	Boyacá		1540		
Pauna	Boyacá		1540–41		
Quipama	Boyacá	24 April	1541		
Maripí	Boyacá		1559		
Muzo	Boyacá	20 February	1559		

== Encomiendas ==
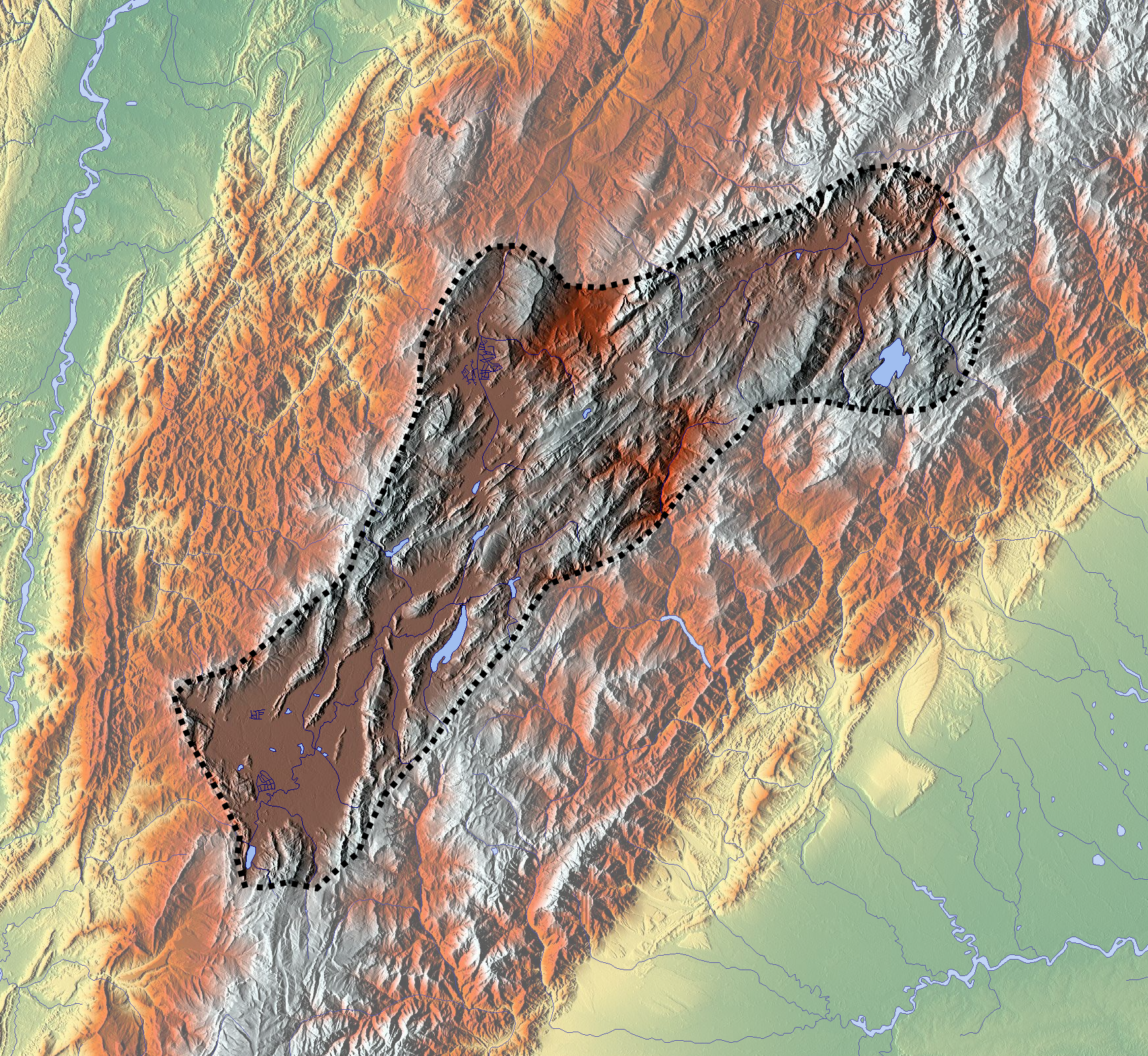
Encomiendas of Luis Lanchero on the Altiplano Cundiboyacense

== See also ==
- List of conquistadors in Colombia
- Spanish conquest of the Muisca
- Muzo people, Hernán Pérez de Quesada
- Nikolaus Federmann

== Bibliography ==
- Fernández de Piedrahita, Lucas (1688), "VI", Historia general de las conquistas del Nuevo Reino de Granada (in Spanish)
- Puche Riart, Octavio (1996), La explotación de las esmeraldas de Muzo (Nueva Granada), en sus primeros tiempos - The exploitation of the emeralds of Muzo (New Kingdom of Granada), the first period (PDF) (in Spanish), vol. 3, pp. 99–104, ISBN 0902806-38-6
- Rodríguez Freyle, Juan; Achury Valenzuela, Darío (1979) [1859 (1638)], El Carnero - Conquista i descubrimiento del nuevo reino de Granada de las Indias Occidentales del mar oceano, i fundacion de la ciudad de Santa Fe de Bogota (PDF) (in Spanish), Fundacion Biblioteca Ayacuch, pp. 1–598
- Tequia Porras, Humberto (2008), Asentamiento español y conflictos encomenderos en Muzo desde 1560 a 1617 - Spanish settlement and encomienda conflicts in Muzo from 1560 to 1617 (M.A.) (PDF) (M.A.) (in Spanish), Pontificia Universidad Javeriana, pp. 1–91
- Uribe, Sylvano E. (1960), "Las esmeraldas de Colombia" [The emeralds from Colombia] (PDF), Boletín de la Sociedad Geográfica de Colombia, 65 (in Spanish), XVIII: 1–8
