= Jerónimo de Ortal =

Spanish conquistador

Jerónimo de Ortal, often Jerónimo (or Hierónimo) Dortal (b. c. 1500 in Spain; † after 1541 in Santo Domingo) was a Spanish conquistador and the first duly appointed governor of the Province of Paria.

== Exploration of the Rio Orinoco ==
Jerónimo de Ortal is mentioned for the first time as a participant in Diego de Ordáz's entrada on the Rio Orinoco. He took part in this venture as an officer and treasurer (tesorero) and was one of Ordáz's closer confidants. It is therefore likely that he - like his intimate Alonso de Herrera - had already participated as a retainer of Ordáz in the conquest of Mexico under Hernán Cortés. During the voyage along the Orinoco River, which lasted from 1531 to 1532, Europeans explored for the first time the hinterland of the coastal region that today belongs to Venezuela and was called Paria by the natives. After the death of Diego de Ordáz, Alonso de Herrera and Jerónimo de Ortal sought the governorship of the province of Paria. While Herrera was provisionally appointed governor of Paria by the Audiencia Real in Santo Domingo, Ortal went to court in Spain.

== Governor of the Province of Paria ==
It is not entirely clear whether the province of Paria had been previously designated by the Crown, or whether it was created at the instigation of Ortal and Herrera. The governor of the adjacent island of Trinidad and the settlers on the island of Cubagua claimed the mainland side in front of their possessions, but did not have valid legal titles. And Diego de Ordáz, although he had forcibly asserted his claims of dominion over Paría against Antonio Sedeño, the governor of Trinidad, also possessed no legal titles for this region, for Ordáz was officially governor of the "Province of the Islands in the Rio Marañón," that is, the mouth of the Amazon.

Jerónimo de Ortal was appointed by the Crown in 1533 - thus very probably the first - governor of the province of Paria, whose boundaries were established from the Gulf of Paria to far west to Cabo Codera. The only permanent Spanish base in the province was Fort Paria in the Gulf of the same name, a fortress of wooden palisades built by Antonio Sedeño in 1530. Ortal returned to Fort Paria in October 1534 with a well-equipped army of conquistadors, where Alonso de Herrera was waiting for him.

== Search for the Province of Meta ==
Their goal was to continue Ordáz's failed expedition. Information from the natives pointed to one or two indigenous "gold kingdoms" in the headwaters of the Orinoco River, referred to as the "Provinces of Meta." Ortal sent Herrera forward with most of the army to establish a base beyond the hostile Orinoco delta to await him and further reinforcements that would arrive in the spring of 1535. Because of the increasing hostility of the natives, Ortal had to abandon Fort Paria. He retreated to Trinidad Island, which had been evacuated by Sedeño in the summer of 1534 after attacks by the indigenous people.

In 1535, the few survivors of Herrera's army returned to the coast under the command of Alvaro de Ordáz, a nephew of Diego de Ordáz. Ortal left the Orinoco region and founded a settlement on the north coast called Sanct Miguel de Neverí near present-day Barcelona. From the western border of his province, he tried to reach the provinces on the Meta by land with a new army. Already in the preparatory phase, there were clashes with the troops of Antonio Sedeño, who undertook an armed expedition with the same goal. About 200 km inland, Ortal's troops mutinied and continued the expedition without him in 1536. He does not seem to have exercised the governorship thereafter.

== Royal official on Cubagua island and death ==
Completely impoverished, Ortal settled on Cubagua, where he would remain "for many years", until shortly before his death. As a "royal contador", he then soon rejoined the city's elite and regained prosperity by organizing illegal slave hunts. While on trial in Santo Domingo, he "took a voluptuous mistress." While taking a siesta on the balcony of her house, he died of a heart attack.

On Cubagua he befriended the chronicler Juan de Castellanos, who lived on the island for a few years from 1541. To him we owe a description of the Conquistador: "He was rather graceful in stature and movements, had a handsome face and cheerful eyes. Many say he was a bad man, but I came to know him as a good man."

== Literature ==
- Gonzalo Fernández de Oviedo y Valdés: Historia General y Natural de las Indias. Madrid 1959.
- Juan de Castellanos: Elegías de varones ilustres de Indias. Bogotá 1997.
- Fray Pedro Aguado: Recopilación Historial. Bogotá 1957.
