= Alonso de Herrera =

Spanish conquistador

Alonso de Herrera (ca. 1500 in Spain – 1534 south of the Rio Guaviare in Colombia) was a Spanish conquistador and temporary governor of the Province of Paria.

== Mexico ==
Alonso de Herrera was a retainer of the conquistador Diego de Ordáz during the conquest of Mexico under Hernán Cortés. As a member of Ordáz's Hueste, he fought against Mayan warriors at the Battle of Cintla in Tabasco on March 25, 1519, survived the Noche Triste, and participated in the conquest of Tenochtitlan.

== Exploration of the Orinoco and Governor of Paria ==
=== 1531–1532 during the discovery of the Orinoco ===
During the first exploration of the Rio Orinoco under the leadership of Diego de Ordáz, Herrera held the office of Maestre de Campo, commander of the foot soldiers. At the middle reaches of the river, the natives told them about a gold-rich province of Meta in the headwaters of the Orinoco. However, the expedition ended at the Atures Rapids, which they could not cross with their ships.

=== Governor of the Province of Paria ===
After the death of Ordáz - who was actually governor of the islands in the Amazon estuary, but instead, perhaps due to a mix-up, had taken possession of the Orinoco estuary, which the natives called Paria - Herrera succeeded him. In doing so, he came into conflict with the governor of Trinidad Island, Antonio Sedeño, who also claimed the territory of Paria. Sedeño imprisoned Herrera, but was ordered by the Real Audiencia in Santo Domingo to release Herrera, who was then also officially appointed by the Audiencia as governor of the newly created province of Paria. In 1534, he had to hand over the governorship to Hierónimo Dortal, who had been appointed the new governor of Paria by the Crown of Spain. Because Herrera and Dortal, both longtime retainers of Diego de Ordáz, subsequently worked together, it is possible that Herrera had merely "held the fort" until Dortal returned from Spain with the deeds of appointment - and a well-equipped army of conquistadors. Together, they resumed the search for the "Province of Meta".

=== 1534 search for the province of Meta at the headwaters of the Orinoco ===
Dortal sent Herrera up the Orinoco with most of the army, 200 men, 22 horses, and several light boats. Instead of establishing a base behind the Orinoco delta and waiting for Dortal, as had been agreed, Herrera undertook the conquest on his own. After overcoming the cataracts, he was the first European to explore the Rio Guaviare, the longest and most water-rich tributary after the confluence with the Rio Orinoco. At a place that cannot be precisely located, the conquistadors went ashore in search of indigenous settlements and immediately became involved in fighting with a Carib-speaking people. As an interpreter with Carib peoples, they had brought with them from the Caribbean the Spanish-speaking Carib Catalina de Perálvarez. In the opinion of Herrera and his people, however, she was viciously misleading the increasingly desperate conquistadors.

== Death and characterization ==
In revenge for her perceived deception, Alonso de Herrera had the Carib Catalina executed. Herrera, described as "sinister and solitary" and "an excellent warrior" who was, however, "better at killing the natives than convincing them," survived Catalina by only a few days. He and 90 of his companions were killed in a surprise attack that included the firing of arrows, some of which were poisoned. Herrera died of arrow poison after three days of agony. The survivors of his Hueste returned to the coast.

== Literature ==
- Gonzalo Fernández de Oviedo y Valdés: Historia General y Natural de las Indias. Vol. II. Edition Madrid 1959.
- Juan de Castellanos: Elegías de varones ilustres de Indias. 2. Edition. Bogotá 1997.
- Fray Pedro Aguado: Recopilación Historial, Teil 2, Vol. III. 19. Edition. Bogotá 1957.
- Bernal Díaz del Castillo: Geschichte der Eroberung von Mexiko. Edited by Georg A. Narciß. Frankfurt am Main 1988, ISBN 3-458-32767-3
