= Juan de Castellanos =

Spanish poet, soldier and Catholic priest

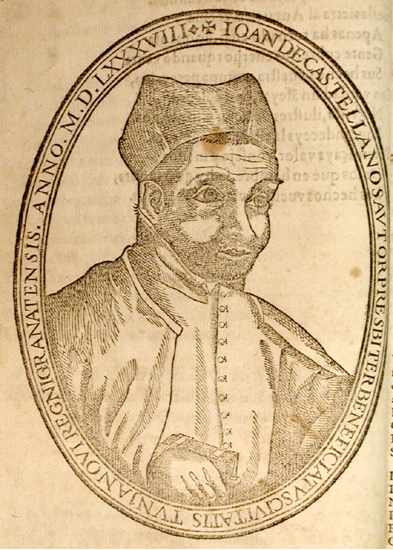
- Portrait of Juan de Castellanos (1589)
- Born: March 9, 1522; Alanís, Sevilla, Spain
- Died: November 1606 (aged 84); Tunja, New Kingdom of Granada
- Writing career
- Language: Spanish
- Notable work: Elegías de varones ilustres de Indias

Juan de Castellanos (March 9, 1522 – November 1606) was a Spanish poet, soldier and Catholic priest who lived in the New Kingdom of Granada. As one of the early Spanish chroniclers he has contributed to the knowledge of the Indigenous peoples of the Americas, mainly the Muisca.

== Biography ==
Juan de Castellanos was born in Alanís, Andalusia, the son of Cristóbal Sánchez Castellanos and Catalina Sánchez. He spent part of his childhood in the nearby village of San Nicolás del Puerto, which he later recalled as his “homeland”. He received his education in Seville, where the presbiter Miguel de Heredia instructed him in grammar and letters.

While still young, he embarked for the West Indies, probably in the 1530s, in the retinue of Baltasar de León, son of the conquistador Juan Ponce de León. Biographical accounts differregarding the exact date of his departure:some authors place it in 1534, others in 1539 or 1540. After an initial stay in Puerto Rico, he settled in the colony of Cubagua, a center of the pearl fisheries, where he took part in commercial and military activities. During these years he had a daughter, Jerónima. In the following years, he participated in several expeditions in the Caribbean regions and on the South American mainlan, including those to Paria, Trinidad, and the Venezuelan coast. He was also involved in the failed expedition of Pedro de Ursúa toward Omagua and El Dorado, later associated with the rebellion of Lope de Aguirre . After various hardships, he moved to Santa Marta, in present-day Colombia, where he took part in military campaigns against Indigenous peoples, such as the Tairona, and in inland expeditions with exploratory or mining purposes. In Cartagena, in 1555, he decided to pursue an ecclesiastical career.

Ordained as a priest, he served as chaplain and parish priest in the city until 1558, and then in Riohacha until 1561. In 1562 he was appointed parish priest of the cathedral of Tunja, where in 1569 he obtained its benefice by royal decree of Philip II. Having settled permanently in Tunja, he amassed a considerable library and landed property, leading a comfortable life and devoting himself to writing. There he spend more than four decades, exercising his ministry and working on his literary works.

He died in Tunja on 27 November 1607 and was buried in the parish church of Santiago in the city.

== Works ==
While in Tunja, de Castellanos composed an epic poem, Elegías de varones ilustres de Indias. The first part of this poem appeared in Madrid in 1588, and the first three parts in 1837. It is the longest poem ever in the Spanish language: 113,609 verses. The Lenox Branch of the New York Public Library possesses a complete copy. The verse recounts successively the deeds of prominent Spaniards in America, beginning with Christopher Columbus, and includes many ethnographic and ethnological details on the colonial history of northern South America.

Castellanos' poem is the second of a series of epic compositions in Spanish treating of the early colonization of America, Ercilla's La Araucana being the earliest in date of publication.

== Trivia ==
- A university in Tunja, the Fundación Universitaria Juan de Castellanos, is named in honour of Juan de Castellanos.

== See also ==
- Elegías de varones ilustres de Indias
