= Mathieu Sagean =

18th-century French Canadian hoaxer

Mathieu Sagean (also written Sajan; also known as Mermande) was a French Canadian soldier and adventurer who falsely claimed that a wealthy kingdom of white people called Acaaniba existed in modern southwest United States.

== Life ==
Mathieu Sagean was born in Lachine, Canada, New France to Jean Sagean and Marie Larrante.

Sagean died after 1711.

== Kingdom of Acaaniba ==
In early 1700, while in Brest, France, Sagean reported that he had discovered a populous kingdom of white people situated in the modern-day southwest United States called the Kingdom of Acaaniba. He journeyed with René-Robert Cavelier de La Salle to the mouth of the Mississippi, and then claimed to have explored further on his own with Henri de Tonti's approval. Accompanied by 11 Frenchman and 2 Mahicans he travelled from the upper Misssissippi river to the fictional river Milly, "river of gold", which was wider than the Misssissippi and flowed south-southwest to Acaaniba.

The Kingdom of Acaaniba was full of ingenious people. Gold was plentiful, with statues and utensils being made of gold. Each year a 3,000-ox caravan loaded with gold was sent on a six days trip to a market, perhaps in Japan. Its climate was ideal for growing fruits and vegetables, wild beasts were peaceful and new types of animals, some similar to those present in South America, provided all food, clothing and objects of day-to-day life. It had a powerful military, but was pacific. The Kingdom's inhabitants avoided the sufferings of work and diseases, if not death itself. They, or at least men, could freely express their sexuality.

Acaaniba's inhabitants shared traits with multiple cultures (notably the Natchezs, western tribes and the Aztec, the latter of which the Acaanibans apparently descended from), and its name was alike to a toponym.

After coming back from Acaaniba, Sagean was (according to his stories) faced with a multitude of dangers (fights, shipwrecks, imprisonment, etc.). He would explore Africa and Asia, until he rejoined England and then France. There were multiple problems with Sagean's chronology.

A report was made by Desclouzeaux, and Sagean was moved to the Rochefort area to be interrogated by Pierre Le Moyne d’Iberville and Michel Bégon. The existence of Acaaniba was to be kept secret in the meanwhile, but some such as Louis de Dangeau were informed, much to their enthusiasm.

Sagean was sent back to the Louisiana by the first ship bound for Mississippi so that he could lead a party of Frenchman to Acaaniba. When he arrived at Fort Maurepas, Biloxi, Henri de Tonti and Pierre Le Sueur immediately cast doubt on his claims and refuted them. Sagean however achieved his main objective of being sent to America.

Sagean created the myth using personal observations, partial descriptions and perhaps embellished stories of explorations likely heard from Spanish and French explorers and adventurers.

The legend of Acaaniba is similar to El Dorado's, but also is a version of the Garden of Eden or Cockaigne.
