= El Dorado =

Legendary city in South America

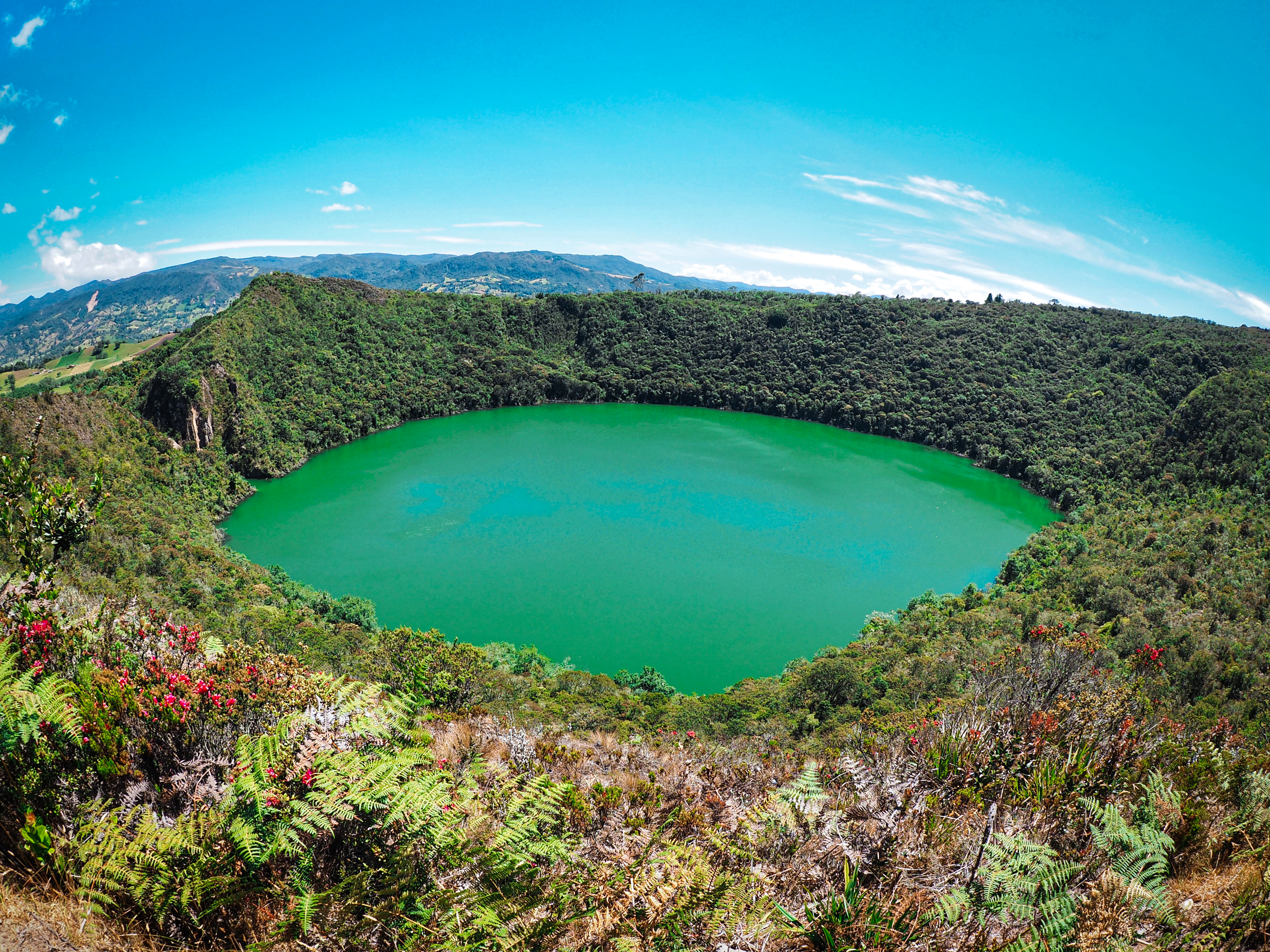
Lake Guatavita in the Cundiboyacan Plateau, which inspired the legend of El Dorado according to the Muisca Golden ceremony

El Dorado (Spanish: [el doˈɾaðo]) is a mythical city of gold supposedly located somewhere in South America. The legend originated in 16th-century Spanish accounts of a ruler known as El Dorado, or the Golden One, who was said to cover himself in gold dust before washing it off in a sacred lake. Over time, the name came to refer not only to the ruler, but also to a lost city or kingdom of immense wealth.

The legend is associated with the Muisca, an indigenous people who inhabited the Altiplano Cundiboyacense in present-day Colombia. Later accounts linked the story to the installation ceremony of a new zipa, involving offerings of gold and other valuables at Lake Guatavita. The Muisca were skilled goldsmiths, and Spanish expeditions under Gonzalo Jiménez de Quesada reached and conquered their territory in 1537. Later attempts were made to drain Lake Guatavita in search of treasure, and objects associated with the El Dorado tradition, including the Muisca raft, are now held by the Museo del Oro in Bogotá.

In the decades that followed, European explorers searched for El Dorado in various parts of South America. Expeditions associated with Gonzalo Pizarro, Francisco Orellana, Philipp von Hutten, Pedro de Ursúa, Antonio de Berrio, and Walter Raleigh shifted the supposed location of the golden city from the Colombian highlands to the Amazon and the Guianas. The legend later became associated with Lake Parime, a supposed inland lake that appeared on maps of the region during the 17th century before its existence was rejected by later explorers and geographers.

Although belief in El Dorado as a real place declined, the legend has had a lasting cultural impact. It became a symbol of fabulous wealth, utopia, and obsessive exploration, appearing in works such as Voltaire's Candide, Edgar Allan Poe's "Eldorado", and later films, games, and adventure fiction.

== Background ==
Christopher Columbus, the first European known to have reached the Americas after the Scandinavians, made landfall in the Caribbean Islands in 1492. Seeing golden ornaments worn by some of the indigenous inhabitants, he assumed that he had found a prosperous land and spent several months travelling from island to island in search of the source of the gold. Although he found no mines, he remained convinced that the newly encountered lands contained great wealth. He promised the Catholic monarchs of Spain, who sponsored the expedition, that with sufficient assistance, he could "give them as much gold as they have need of".

European accounts of the newly encountered lands were influenced by older legends of wealthy utopias across the Atlantic. The ancient Greeks believed that somewhere in the Atlantic lay the Isles of the Blessed, an earthly paradise with a permanently temperate climate. According to second-century author Lucian, the inhabitants of these islands lived in cities made of gold, ivory, and emeralds. The Atlantic also gave its name to the mythical continent of Atlantis, which was said to be home to an advanced civilization rich in gold, silver, and orichalcum. During the Middle Ages, stories circulated about the Isle of Seven Cities, a supposed Christian haven that frequently appeared on 15th-century maps and may have influenced the later legend of the Seven Cities of Gold. Columbus was also interested in locating the biblical regions of Ophir and Tarshish, from which King Solomon was said to have imported vast quantities of treasure. He believed that these places, along with the Garden of Eden, were somewhere on the newly discovered continent, and many who followed him shared these beliefs.

The early Spanish settlers in the Caribbean Islands, however, found their expectations disappointed. The indigenous inhabitants possessed small amounts of gold, but did not mine it systematically, and the Spanish mining activity quickly exhausted the local supply. The settlers' attention then turned towards the mainland, and colonies began to be established along the South American coast. Despite this unpromising beginning, the conquest of the Aztecs by Hernán Cortés and the conquest of the Incas by Francisco Pizarro soon rekindled European hopes that vast gold deposits remained to be found.

== Origin of the legend ==
=== Rumours of gold ===
A map of northwestern South America, with modern-day Colombia highlighted in green, showing places associated with early El Dorado rumours

The first European incursion into Venezuela was by Ambrosius Dalfinger, governor of the Spanish settlement of Coro. Dalfinger was an employee of the Welser banking family of Augsburg, a German firm to which Charles V of Spain had granted the governorship of Venezuela and a licence to explore the territory as security for a loan. One of the Welsers' principal concerns was to find a passage through the continent to the Pacific Ocean, then known as the South Sea; such a passage would have opened up a new route to India and given Spain an advantage in the spice trade.

To this end, in August 1529, Dalfinger set out with an expeditionary force to Lake Maracaibo. At the time, Europeans still had an incomplete understanding of South American geography, and some hoped that inland waterways might offer a route toward the Pacific. During the course of the nine-month journey, they looted numerous golden trinkets from the local population, and were told that these had been acquired through trade with a certain tribe high up in the mountains. Upon his return to Coro, Dalfinger found that in his absence, he had been presumed dead; the Welsers had sent along a replacement governor, Hans Seissenhofer, who had named Nikolaus Federmann as deputy. Dalfinger now resumed the governorship, but temporarily left Federmann in charge while he recovered from an illness.

Federmann, taking advantage of his new authority, soon launched his own expedition into the interior. Placating the indigenous tribes with gifts of beads and iron tools, and searching for information about the South Sea, he was told that the lands bordering this sea were rich in gold, pearls, and gemstones. Enquiring further, Federmann's party were directed to a hilltop from which they could see what appeared to be a large body of water. This was in fact the llanos, a grassland plain which is subject to periodic floods. Having failed to find a route to the Pacific, and faced with difficult terrain, widespread illness, and increasingly hostile indigenous groups, Federmann was forced to return to Coro empty-handed.

Dalfinger banished Federmann from Venezuela for four years as punishment for abandoning his post. Dalfinger then ventured inland once again in June 1531, travelling southwest to the banks of the river Cesar. Here, he heard from the Chiri people of a mountain province called "Xerira", which was said to be the source of golden artefacts found among the lowland peoples. Friede identifies Xerira with the Jerira or Jerida plateau, inhabited by the Guane, at the northern edge of the Chibcha plateau. Dalfinger also heard that the tribe that made the golden objects also exported large quantities of salt. Armed with this clue, he led his party south to the trading post of Tamalameque, then followed the salt trail into the highlands. At an altitude of 12,000 ft (3,700 m), facing attacks from indigenous groups and freezing temperatures, the expedition realised that it could no longer advance further south. It turned southeast in the hope of reaching "Tibu", said to be the place "where the three rivers meet". Dalfinger later separated from the main party, hoping to quickly reach Lake Maracaibo. He was ambushed on the way and died after being shot with a poisoned arrow. The remainder of the expedition returned to Coro on 2 November 1533.

Meanwhile, another group of conquistadores, led by Diego de Ordaz, was searching for the source of the Orinoco River. Sailing inland from the east, rowing hard against the current, they eventually reached the confluence of the Orinoco and the Meta. They attempted to continue south along the Orinoco, but soon ran into impassable rapids. Returning downriver, they were attacked by Caribs; Ordaz's men routed their attackers and captured two. One of the prisoners, being asked if he knew of any gold in the vicinity, told the Spaniards that if they followed the westward course of the Meta River, they would find a kingdom ruled by "a very valiant one-eyed Indian", and that if they found him, "they could fill their boats with that metal". Ordaz attempted to follow this advice immediately, but it was now the dry season and the river level was dropping rapidly. Finally admitting defeat, Ordaz sailed for Spain to make preparations for a second expedition, but died of an illness at sea. Before long, "Meta" would become the general name for the legendary golden kingdom.

In 1534, Sebastián de Belalcázar, one of Pizarro's lieutenants, conquered the Inca city of Quito, where he expected to find great quantities of treasure. Not finding as much as he had hoped, he assumed that the real treasure had been hidden, and set about capturing the local chiefs, whom he tortured for information. One of the chiefs captured during these campaigns was not an Incan; he said that he came from a land 12 days' march to the north. The Spaniards called him el indio dorado, "the golden Indian". The reason for this is not clear, but it may have been because he wore golden armour or other body ornaments. Interested in finding the homeland of this "golden Indian", Belalcázar sent an expedition party north, where they discovered the province of Popayán. However, Belalcázar himself made no further move at this time.

=== Conquest of the Muisca ===
==== Journeys of Hohermuth and Quesada ====
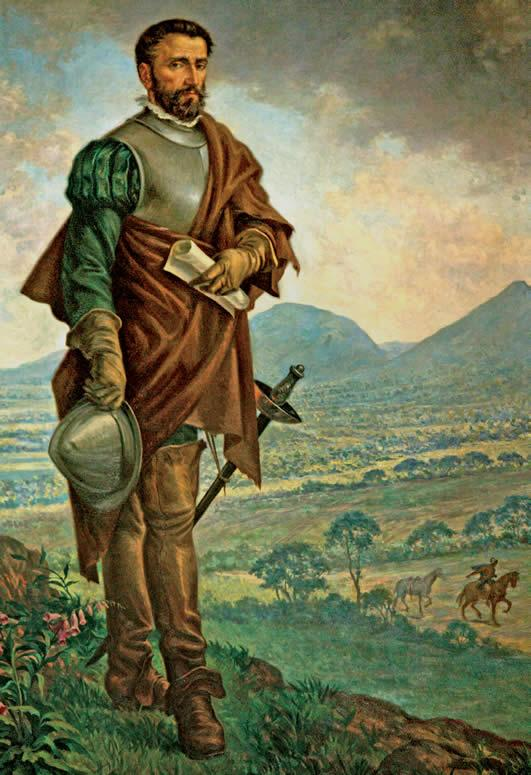
Gonzalo Jiménez de Quesada

Following the death of Dalfinger, Georg Hohermuth von Speyer became the new governor of Coro, arriving at the colony in 1535. Federmann returned to Coro in the same year, and resumed his former post as deputy. Hohermuth sent Federmann on an expedition to the Upar Valley in the west, while leading his own expedition south in the hope of finding gold in either direction. Hohermuth's party followed the course of the Andes south-southwest along the edge of the llanos. After a two-year trek, they reached the region of the Ariari River, where they heard rumours of a rich land to the west. By this time, however, morale was low. Over 200 men had died along the way, many of the survivors were too ill to fight, and Hohermuth was forced to turn back.

On the other side of the mountain range, a party led by the lawyer-turned-general Gonzalo Jiménez de Quesada was also searching for the land of Meta. The expedition had set out from the Spanish colony of Santa Marta in April 1536, with the dual aim of finding an overland route to Peru and a strait to the Pacific. Both goals were thought to be achievable by following the Magdalena River to its source. The party travelled south as far as La Tora (modern-day Barrancabermeja), where they found that the river had become too narrow and fast-flowing to continue. Although the expedition had suffered heavy losses, Quesada convinced his men not to turn back, declaring, "it would be ignoble to return with nothing done". He had noticed cakes of rock salt in use among the people of La Tora and nearby areas, and suspected that they had been acquired through trade with a more advanced society to the east. Rumours of a wealthy province called Meta led Quesada, like Dalfinger before him, to follow the salt trail into the mountains.

In March 1537, after a lengthy climb, Quesada's party arrived at the edge of a high plateau, at a place they named Grita Valley (near modern-day Vélez). The plateau was home to a prosperous civilization, and the villages the Spaniards passed through yielded impressive quantities of gold and emeralds. They had entered into the territory of the Muisca.

==== Quesada's conquest of the Muisca ====
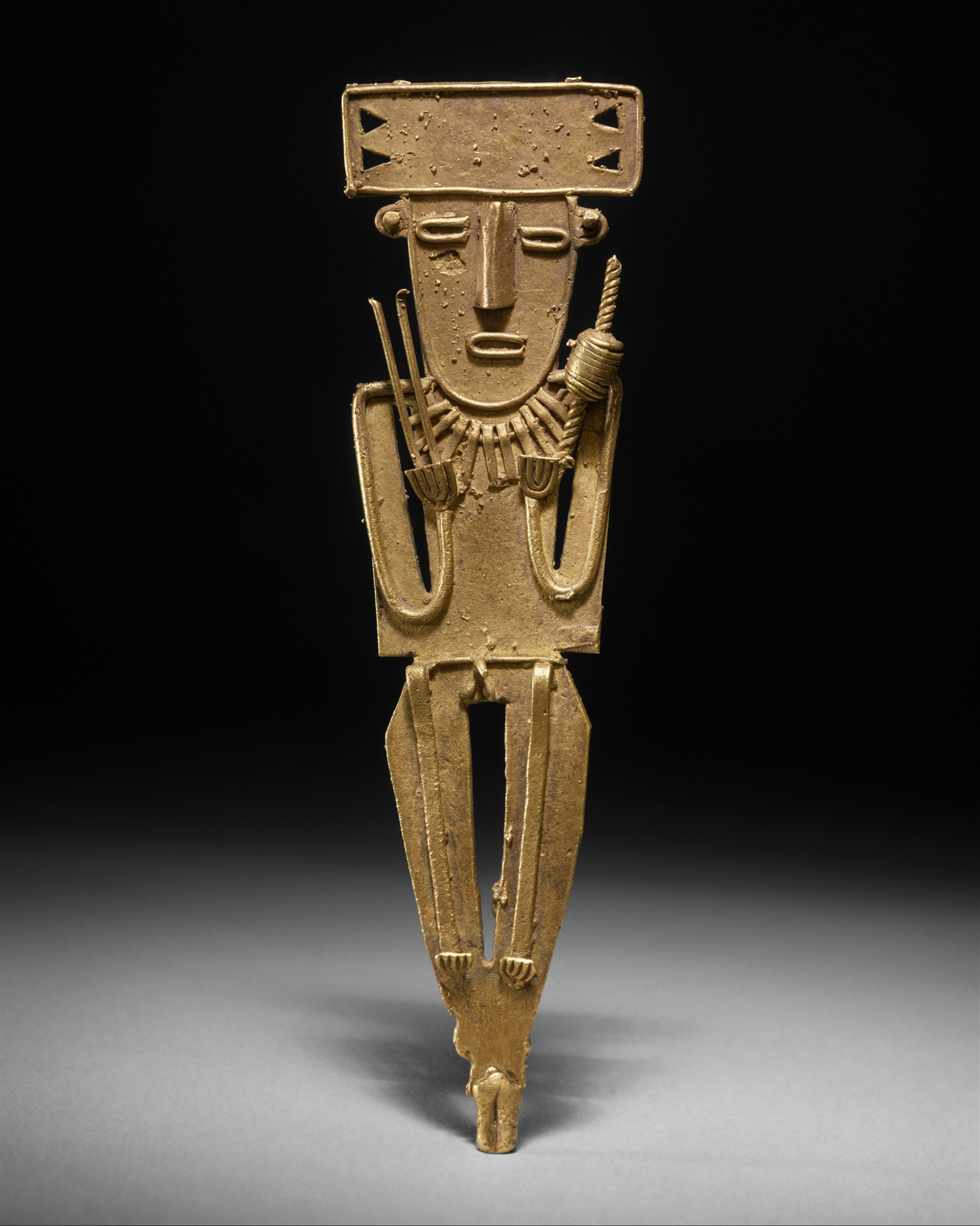
A Muisca tunjo

The Muisca were an agricultural people who built in wood rather than stone. They were not a unified tribe, but were organized into independent chiefdoms. The two most important rulers, to whom most of the other chieftains paid fealty, were the zipa, who ruled the lands to the south, and the zacque, who ruled the lands to the north. The Muisca were skilled goldsmiths and cotton weavers, but they produced little cotton of their own and had no gold mines within their territory. They acquired these raw materials through trade, exporting salt from natural deposits, as well as manufactured objects such as golden jewellery and cotton blankets. Most golden objects crafted by the Muisca were actually made of tumbaga, a gold-copper alloy. Gold played an important role in Muisca religion. It decorated major temples and was used for votive offerings and funerary goods, often as anthropomorphic tunjo figures.

Quesada's first move on reaching the Muisca plateau was to march on the zipa's palace at Bacatá, near modern-day Funza. (Note: The town's name was transliterated by the Spanish to Bogothá or Bogotá, but it lay a little west of the modern-day city of Bogotá. The name Bacatá or Bogotá can also refer to the wider region.) The forces sent to halt the Spanish advance were defeated, and by the end of April, Quesada had entered Bacatá. The zipa, however, had fled with his treasure.

After several failed attempts to track him down, Quesada moved to the northern territory, where he had heard that emerald mines existed. He found the mines at Somondoco, but his men extracted only a few emeralds. He then continued north to Tunja, home of the zacque, where the conquistadores seized what Francis describes as "the single greatest haul of treasure in the entire conquest of Muisca territory". They captured the zacque and looted the palace, then turned their attention to nearby Sogamoso, a major religious centre and the site of the Muisca's most sacred temple, Sugamuxi. The temple was destroyed after two Spanish soldiers, Sánchez and Rodríguez, entered it at night to remove its gold decorations. While removing the gold, they set their lit torches on the temple's grass floor matting, causing a fire that spread through the building despite Spanish efforts to extinguish it. Although the temple was lost, Spanish officials reported that 40,000 pesos of fine gold were found at Sogamoso.

Still seeking the zipa's treasure, Quesada led his men back to Bacatá. After discovering Tisquesusa's mountain stronghold, he launched a night-time attack. In the darkness, the Spanish failed to recognise the zipa among the fugitives, and he was later found dead on the hill from two wounds. Spanish officers believed Tisquesusa had been killed by mistake because he had not been recognised. The zipas successor, Sagipa, negotiated an alliance with the Spaniards, but could not reveal the location of the hidden treasure. Sagipa was later tortured to death, though Quesada denied responsibility for the action.

==== Arrival of Belalcázar and Federmann ====
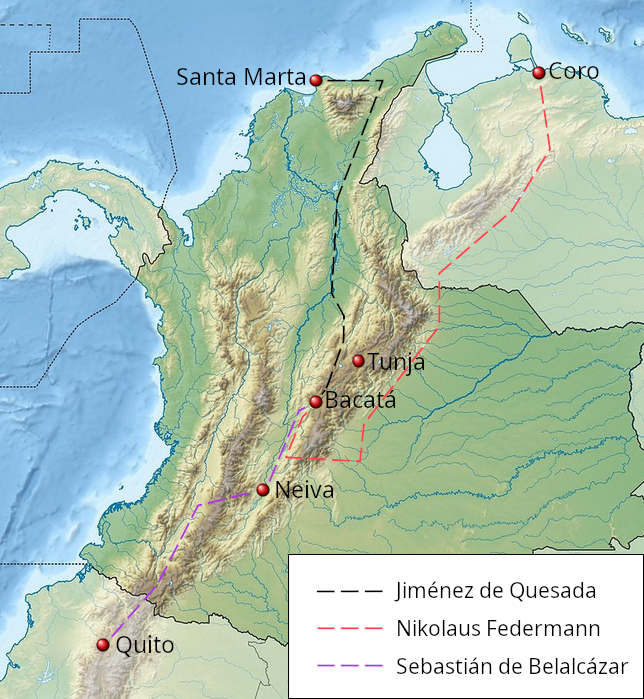
Approximate routes taken by Quesada, Federmann, and Belalcázar

In early 1539, after nearly two years on the plateau, Quesada received reports that a group of Europeans was camped in the Magdalena Valley near Neiva, southwest of Bacatá. This was an army led by Sebastián de Belalcázar, who had left Quito hurriedly in March 1538, after learning that his former general, Francisco Pizarro, had issued a warrant for his arrest. Arriving at Popayán, he had decided to venture east into the highlands. According to Belalcázar's treasurer, Gonzalo de la Peña, the expedition left Popayán "in search of a land called el dorado". This is the first appearance of this phrase in the historical record.

Quesada sent a scouting party to investigate the newcomers; the rival expeditions met amicably, and shortly afterwards, Quesada was informed that Belalcázar's forces were approaching Bacatá. At the same time, he was told by his Indigenous allies that a third army was making its way up the slopes from the direction of the llanos. This force would prove to be headed by Nikolaus Federmann.

Federmann, following his mission to the Upar Valley, had returned to Coro in September 1536. Finding Hohermuth still absent, he embarked on an unauthorized journey to the south-southwest, following Hohermuth's trail. He was joined by survivors of another venture led by Jerónimo de Ortal, who had attempted to follow in Ordaz's footsteps and locate the headwaters of the Meta. His men had mutinied against Ortal and struck out on their own; meeting up with Federmann, they brought with them the idea that the legendary land of gold was situated on higher ground. Federmann, like Hohermuth, skirted the edge of the Andes, but at one point took a detour into the plains, which happened to prevent his party from meeting Hohermuth's returning expedition. Contemporary accounts suggest that Federmann deliberately avoided Hohermuth so as not to have to abandon his own quest and give assistance.

Reaching the Ariari River towards the end of 1538, Federmann heard from the natives that much gold was to be found to the west, and consequently began an assault on the Andean slopes. In February 1539, Federmann's bedraggled troops emerged onto the plateau near Pasca. Within two months, (Note: When Belalcázar arrived at Bacatá is unknown, but the earliest documented date of his presence there is 14 April 1539.) the armies of Federmann, Quesada, and Belalcázar were encamped within sight of each other at Bacatá, within roughly six leagues of one another. All of the new arrivals believed that they had a claim to the plateau and its spoils. The geography of South America was still uncertain, and Belalcázar insisted that the Muisca territory lay within his jurisdiction, while Federmann argued that it was part of Venezuela. Quesada, a lawyer by training, resolved the tension by drawing up a contract. He granted each of his rival conquistadors a portion of the wealth he had looted from the Muisca, and all three agreed to return to Spain together and lay their territorial claims before the Council of the Indies. Then, on 29 April 1539, the three men jointly founded the city of Bogotá in the name of Charles V.

=== Development of the legend ===
==== Contemporary accounts ====
Aside from the aforementioned statement by Gonzalo de la Peña (from a testimony given in July 1539), no written references to a place or a person called "El Dorado" have been found prior to 1541. In this year, historian Oviedo recorded a story that was current among the Spanish inhabitants of Quito, relating to a native ruler called the "Golden Chief" or "King":

They tell me that what they have learned from the Indians is that that great lord or prince goes about continually covered in gold dust as fine as ground salt. He feels that it would be less beautiful to wear any other ornament ... He washes away at night what he puts on each morning, so that it is discarded and lost, and he does this every day of the year ... The Indians say that this chief or king is a very rich and great ruler. He anoints himself every morning with a certain gum or resin that sticks very well. The powdered gold adheres to that unction ... until his entire body is covered from the soles of his feet to his head. He looks as resplendent as a gold object worked by the hand of a great artist.

Oviedo did not specify where the golden prince was to be found, but by the 1580s, the legend had become definitely associated with the Muisca, as evidenced by the following account written by Juan de Castellanos: (Note: The original account was in the form of a poem, a portion of Elegías de varones ilustres de Indias. An English verse translation can be found in Zahm, J. A. (1917), The Quest of El Dorado, D. Appleton and Company, p. 10.)

Belalcázar interrogated a foreign, itinerant Indian resident in the city of Quito, who said he was a citizen of Bogotá and had come there by I know not what means. He stated that Bogotá was a land rich in emeralds and gold. Among the things that attracted them, he told of a certain king, unclothed, who went on rafts on a pool to make oblations, which he had observed, anointing all [his body] with resin and on top of it a quantity of ground gold, from the bottom of his feet to his forehead, gleaming like a ray of the sun ... The soldiers, delighted and content, then gave [that king] the name El Dorado.

A later author, Antonio Herrera, connected this "itinerant Indian" with the indio dorado captured by Belalcázar in 1534. However, modern scholars have argued that a citizen of Bacatá would have no reason to travel as far south as Quito, either for purposes of trade or, as suggested by Herrera, as a diplomatic envoy. Bray argues that Castellanos's account is unreliable. Avellaneda similarly rejects El Dorado as a motive for Belalcázar's expedition to the New Kingdom, stating that the legend became known only after Belalcázar had left Muisca territory.

A new element in Castellanos's version of the story is the king's habit of making oblations on a raft. In the early 17th century, Pedro Simón elaborated on this ceremony, claiming that it took place at Lake Guatavita near Bogotá, and that the gold dust was offered as a sacrifice to a supernatural entity living in the lake. Juan Rodríguez Freyle, in 1636, was the first to describe the ceremony as an investiture ritual undergone by each new zipa. Freyle claimed to have received his information from the nephew of the last Indigenous ruler of Guatavita who followed the Inca trail south to their gold mines at Puente del Inca.

==== Modern-day assessment ====
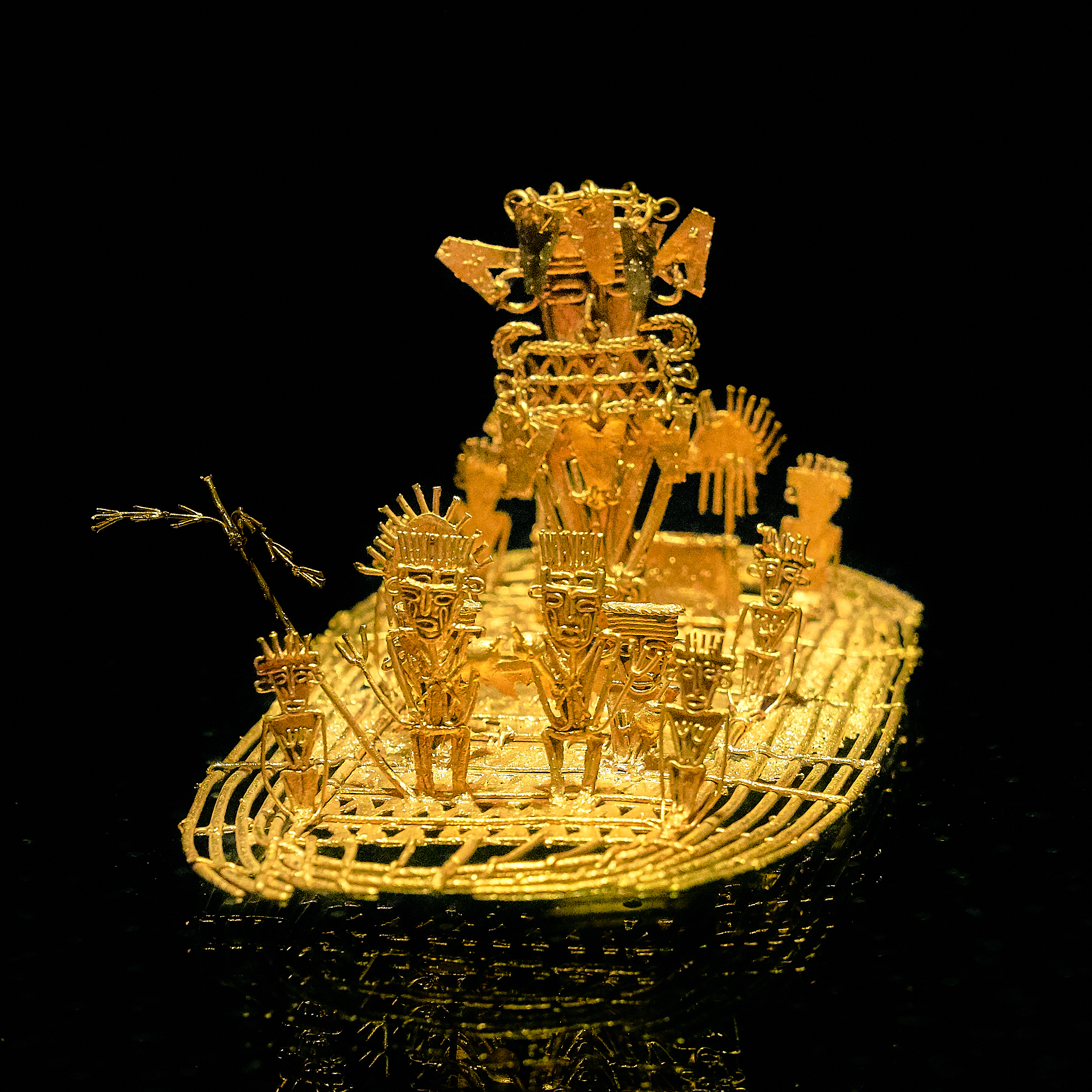
The Muisca raft

Historians disagree on the veracity of these reports. Warwick Bray states that the Spanish conquerors heard the legend from Muisca people who had witnessed the ceremony first-hand. Demetrio Ramos Pérez, followed by John Hemming among others, argues that the story was invented by the Spaniards themselves. José Ignacio Avellaneda regards it as "rather certain" that the legend had a factual basis. J. P. Quintero-Guzmán suggests that the Guatavita ceremony may have been a one-time event, which lived on in the oral history of the Muisca until the arrival of the Spaniards.

Lakes featured heavily in Muisca religion. The mother goddess Bachué was said to have emerged from a lake before peopling the earth, and then returned to the water in the form of a serpent. Guatavita was one of several sacred lakes found within Muisca territory, and gold, emeralds and other objects were often deposited at the lakeside as sacrificial offerings.

An archaeological find known as the Muisca raft has often been cited as evidence for the historicality of the El Dorado legend. Discovered in 1969 in a cave in the region of Pasca, this golden artefact depicts a man of high status, probably a chief, seated on a raft and surrounded by attendants. Quintero-Guzmán calls the relationship between this object and the legend of the golden man "almost undeniable". A similar object, found at Lake Siecha in 1856, but later destroyed in a fire, was also described as a representation of the same ceremony, though others argued that it depicted an ordinary leisure cruise.

Lake Guatavita itself later became the target of attempts to remove the offerings believed to have been deposited there. The first documented attempt was made by Antonio de Sepúlveda, who received a royal licence to drain the lake in 1562 and extracted some gold and emeralds from the exposed mud. Later attempts included an English-financed operation in the early 20th century, after which objects taken from the lake were sent to London for exhibition and auction. The Muisca raft is now held by the Museo del Oro in Bogotá.

== The search for El Dorado ==
=== Pizarro and Orellana ===
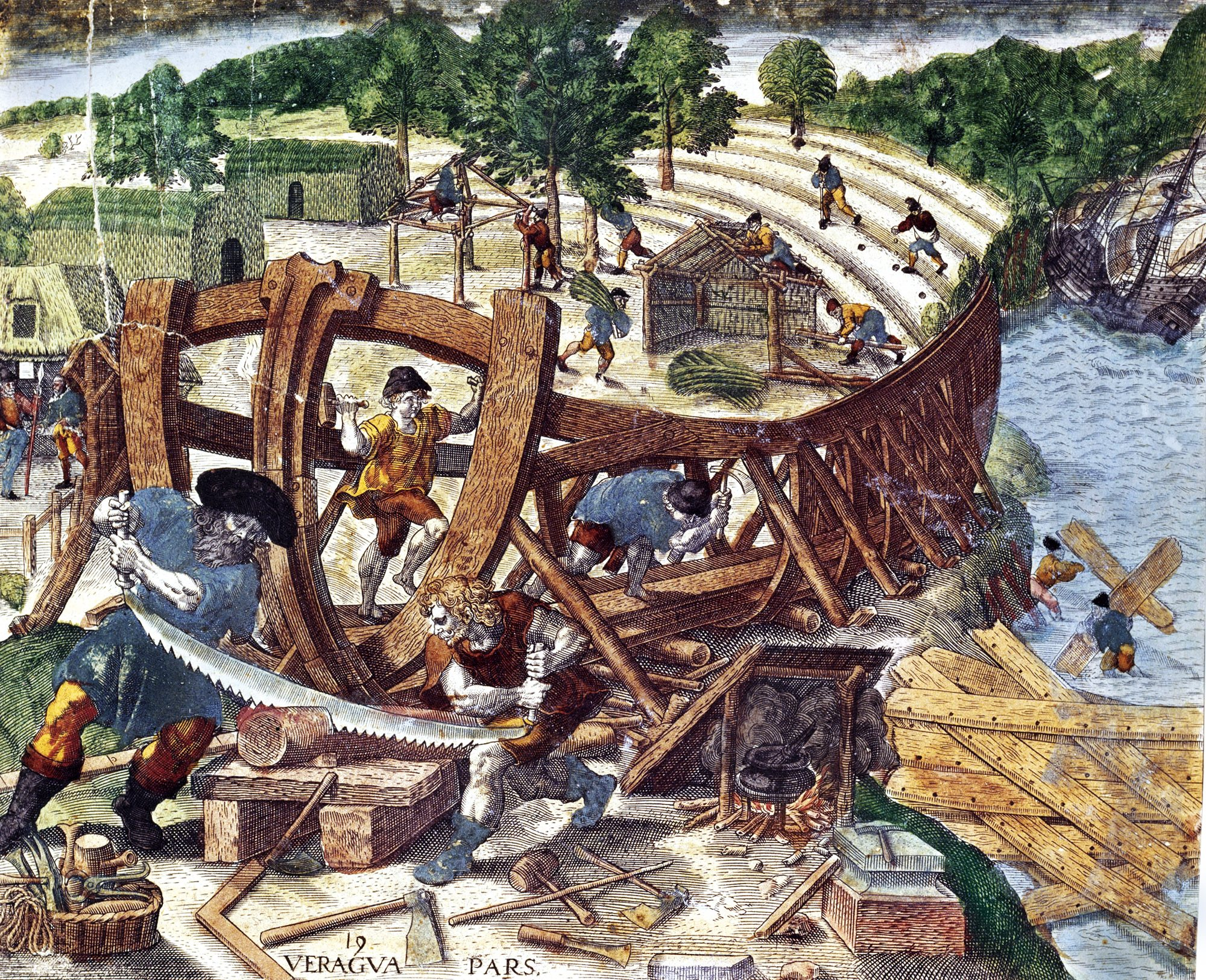
Pizarro's men building a boat to sail the Coca River

Gonzalo Pizarro, brother of Francisco, was governor of Quito at the time when the legend of El Dorado was developing. In February 1541, he led an expedition out of Quito to the east, hoping to find the country of this golden king. He was guided in his choice of direction by the report of a Spaniard who claimed to have been in a place called Cinnamon Valley, and had heard that beyond the valley was a flat, open country whose inhabitants wore golden jewellery. Accompanying the expedition as second-in-command was Francisco Orellana, a kinsman of the Pizarros.

On finding a few cinnamon (cassia) trees, Pizarro enquired among the locals about the way to El Dorado; when they were unable to give him any information, he had them tortured and killed. After some aimless searching, the expedition arrived at the banks of the Coca River, where they met an Indigenous chief named Delicola. Pizarro's reputation preceded him, and Delicola told him that a wealthy and powerful civilization could be found farther downstream. Pizarro built a boat, and the expedition sailed down the Coca to the Napo River.

On 25 December, Pizarro was forced to call a halt, as his starving men were threatening to mutiny. Delicola, whom they had brought with them as a prisoner, assured them the land they sought was just a few days' journey down the river. Orellana suggested that he take the healthiest men aboard the boat and go in search of food, while Pizarro and the others followed on foot. Pizarro approved the plan, expecting Orellana to return with supplies within twelve days. However, Orellana was unable to find sufficient quantities of food to satisfy Pizarro's army, and soon realized that in any case, returning upstream would be impossible. He made the decision to abandon Pizarro and sail on. Reaching the confluence of the Napo River with the Amazon, his men and he became the first Europeans to sail upon the latter river. They successfully navigated its entire length, eventually emerging into the Atlantic Ocean.

During their voyage, Orellana's party passed through a long stretch of land inhabited by the Omagua. Impressed by their religious idols, their skilfully crafted pottery, and their well-maintained trading routes, Orellana took captives and questioned them about their culture. They told him that very wealthy people lived a little way inland, but Orellana decided that he lacked the manpower to investigate further. Nonetheless, early accounts of Orellana's expedition connected the Omagua with gold ornaments, large settlements, and the search for El Dorado, helping to sustain later European interest in expeditions to the Amazon.

=== Hernán de Quesada and Philipp von Hutten ===
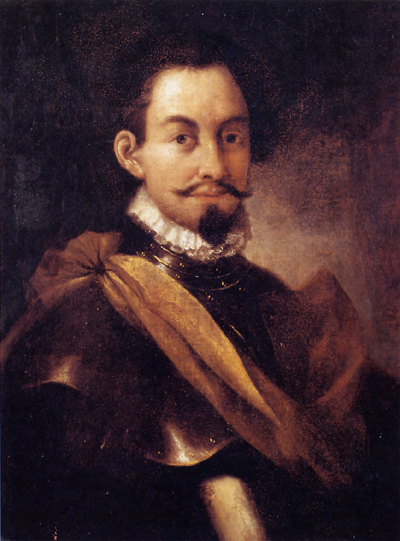
Philipp von Hutten

When Jiménez de Quesada departed for Spain, he left his brother Hernán in temporary command of the Muisca province, now known as New Granada. After hearing accounts of El Dorado, Hernán organized an expedition to the south, believing that his position in the heart of Colombia and his men's local knowledge would give him an advantage in the search. The expedition left Bogotá in September 1541. After suffering from illness and starvation, but encouraged by persistent rumours of golden lands ahead, the party turned westward and reached the region of Pasto, an area already colonized by Belalcázar. There the expedition was abandoned as a failure.

In early 1542, Philipp von Hutten, a German nobleman who had travelled with Hohermuth, set out to find the wealthy land that he believed Hohermuth had nearly reached. He was joined by Bartholomeus Welser, a member of the merchant banking family that governed Venezuela. Leading their men along the edge of the llanos, they came upon the tracks of Hernán de Quesada's southbound expedition. They reasoned that Quesada would not have deserted his province unless he expected to find even greater wealth, and decided to follow the same route. An Indigenous chief informed them that there were no rich settlements in that direction and said that he had heard from neighbouring tribes that the Spaniards who had passed that way were dead or dying. Von Hutten dismissed this as an attempt to divert him from his mission.

Towards the end of 1543, on the banks of the Guaviare River, von Hutten heard from local people of nearby "enormous towns of very rich people who possessed innumerable wealth". He was guided to an Omagua village, where he was told that the chief owned several life-sized effigies of solid gold and that still richer chieftains lived farther beyond. The Europeans attacked the village, and von Hutten and his captain were badly wounded by Indigenous lancers. The expedition retreated to Coro, intending to return with a larger force. By the time they returned, however, a Spanish revolt against the Germans led to the beheading of Bartholomeus Welser and von Hutten.

=== Pedro de Ursúa and Aguirre ===
In 1550, Charles V ordered the suspension of all expeditions while a debate was held in Spain on their legitimacy. The suspension lasted nearly a decade, until 1559, when Pedro de Ursúa received permission from the Viceroy of Peru to equip an expedition to the Amazon. By then, many Peruvian settlers believed that the fabled El Dorado lay among the Omagua. Accounts from earlier European explorers had been supported by a group of Indigenous Brazilians who had recently arrived in the Peruvian town of Chachapoyas, having travelled upstream along the Amazon. They said that they had been among the Omagua and spoke of "the inestimable value of their riches, and the vastness of their trading". Encouraged by these reports, Ursúa assembled a force of 370 Spaniards and departed with a flotilla of small boats on 26 September 1560.

A secondary purpose of the expedition was to provide employment for the idle veterans of recent civil wars; among them was Lope de Aguirre, a disgraced former soldier who had no interest in El Dorado and little loyalty to his superiors. On 1 January 1561, Aguirre led a mutiny against the expedition's leaders. The mutineers killed Pedro de Ursúa and elected Fernando de Guzmán, a Spanish nobleman, as their "lord and prince". A few months later, Aguirre had Guzmán assassinated and assumed command. The quest for El Dorado was abandoned, and the mutineers sailed down the Amazon with the intention of conquering Peru. They reached the ocean and sailed north before landing at Borburata and marching overland towards the Andes. The journey ended at Barquisimeto, where Aguirre was killed by his own men.

=== Martín de Poveda and Jiménez de Quesada ===
In 1566, a new expedition was launched from Peru under Martín de Poveda, accompanied by Pedro Maraver de Silva and Diego Soleto. They travelled north along the Andes from Chachapoyas to Bogotá, eventually concluding that El Dorado was not to be found in the region. Information received from Indigenous people along the route instead pointed towards the eastern llanos as the site of the legendary city.

Meanwhile, Jiménez de Quesada had settled in New Granada, where he had been appointed adelantado of the colony. Encouraged by the arrival of Martín de Poveda's troops and their report that El Dorado lay to the east, Quesada obtained permission from the king to conquer and explore the eastern plains. He departed in December 1569 with an army of 300 Spaniards and 1,500 Indigenous people, including Christian converts and mestizos. Nothing was heard from him for two and a half years, until he reportedly returned to Bogotá with only 50 surviving soldiers and 30 Indigenous people, having "made no settlement and ... achieved nothing".

=== Antonio de Berrio ===
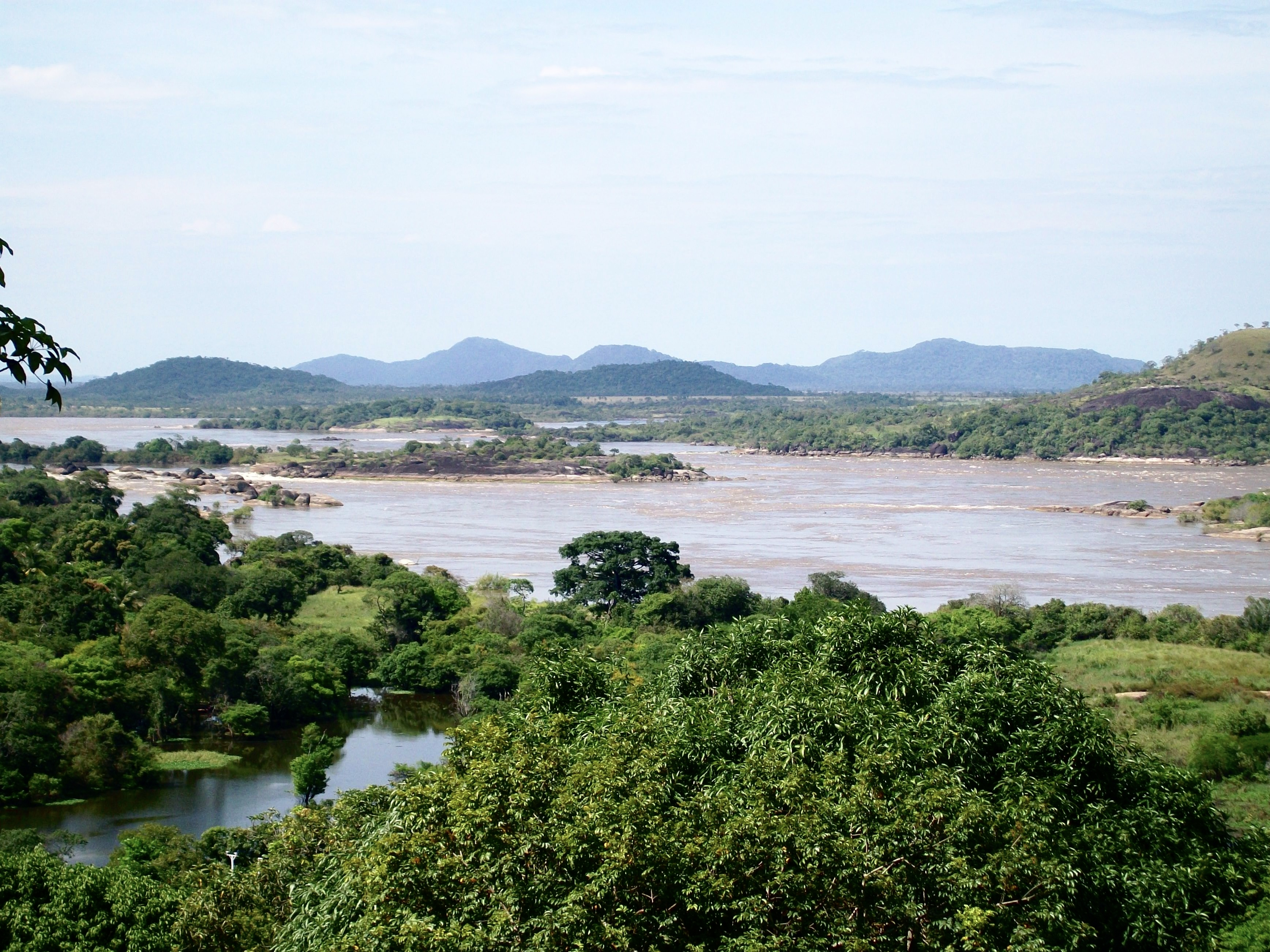
The Orinoco River

Quesada died in 1579, and his estates and title were inherited by his son-in-law, Antonio de Berrio. As Quesada's will stipulated that his successor must continue to search "most insistently" for El Dorado, Berrio gathered an expeditionary force and set out across the llanos. By April 1584, he was encamped four leagues from the Orinoco River, which runs along the western edge of the plain. Berrio believed that El Dorado was located somewhere in the highlands of the Guianas, on the far side of the river. Captured Indigenous people told him under questioning that these highlands contained "great settlements and a very great number of people, and great riches of gold and precious stones". They also spoke of a great lake within the Guianas that they called Manoa. Berrio led his men across the Orinoco, but soon found that they were unable to continue and was forced to turn back.

In March 1587, Berrio launched a second expedition. He crossed the river again and spent several months exploring the forests on the other side, searching for a route into the mountains. Eventually, his men rebelled and deserted, leaving him no choice but to return to Bogotá.

During his third attempt, which began in March 1590, Berrio decided to row downstream along the Orinoco, north and east, to reach the Caroní River, which flowed into the Orinoco from the Guianas. The Caroní was known to be unnavigable, but Berrio hoped that a route to the Guianas could be found by following its banks. When he reached the confluence, he found he had too few men to make the ascent. He continued down the Orinoco, emerging into the Atlantic Ocean not far from Trinidad. He and his followers founded San José de Oruña on the island and began preparations for a final assault on the Guianas.

=== Walter Raleigh ===
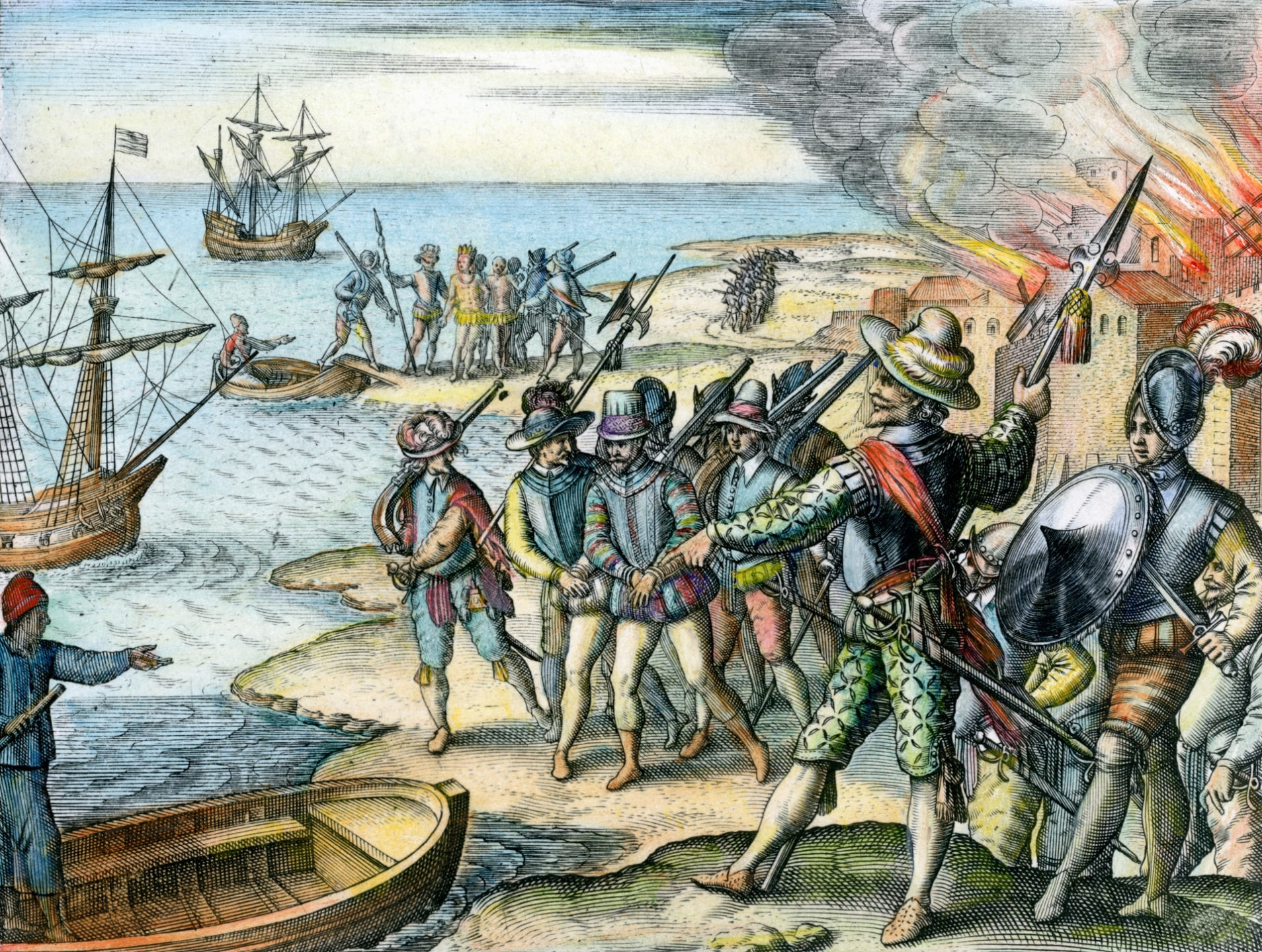
Walter Raleigh at Trinidad

On 22 March 1595, an English fleet headed by Sir Walter Raleigh arrived off the coast of Trinidad. Raleigh made peaceful overtures to the Spanish inhabitants of the island, trading with them and entertaining them aboard his ships. Under the influence of wine, the Spaniards spoke freely of Berrio's activities in Guiana, the geography of the land, and of the riches they believed were to be found in the interior. On 7 April, Raleigh launched a surprise attack against the town of San José and captured Berrio. Having obtained what information he could from the experienced conquistador, Raleigh announced his own intention to enter Guiana and find the golden city.

Unable to bring his ships into the narrow channels of the Orinoco Delta, Raleigh had his carpenters adapt one of them, possibly a galleass, so that it drew only 5 feet (1.5 m) of water. This vessel could carry 60 men, while another 40 were distributed among the smaller boats. They made slow progress through the delta and soon became lost in what Raleigh described as a "labyrinth of rivers". Eventually, they emerged into the Caño Manamo and from there into the Orinoco proper. The expedition then continued slowly upriver, camping on small islands because the banks were too steep and stony. It passed through the territory of a chieftain called Putmaya, where Raleigh noted blue metallic-looking rocks and open, level country to the south. The party then passed near the area later occupied by the Spanish forts of San Francisco de Asís and San Diego de Alcalá. After five days on the Orinoco, Raleigh reached Arromaia and anchored near an island he called Murrecotima, where he encountered the Arawak chief Aramiari returning from trade upriver. The next day the expedition arrived at the "port of Morequito", a landing place on the south bank of the Orinoco, from which messengers were sent to the local cacique, Topiawari.

Topiawari, chief of the Orenoqueponi, lived about fourteen miles (23 km) inland near the confluence of the Orinoco and the Caroni. Raleigh entered into friendly relations with him. Topiawari told him that his people had recently been driven out of inland Guiana by a warlike tribe from the west. This appeared to support the theory, current among the Spanish and strongly held by Raleigh, that El Dorado was populated by fugitive Incas from Peru. Topiawari later told Raleigh that the invading tribe was rich in gold, and that their nearest town, four days' journey to the south, was the source of "all those plates of gold which were scattered among the borderers, and carried to other nations far and near ... but that those of the land within were far finer". (Note: Charles Nicholl doubts whether Raleigh's account of this conversation can be trusted, given how closely it conforms to Raleigh's own ideas.)

Raleigh continued on to the mouth of the Caroní, where the strength of the current prevented any further progress. He sent out two reconnaissance parties overland and accompanied a third himself. The men found a few stones that appeared valuable, but most of these proved to be worthless. They also received information that at the head of the Caroní stood a great lake, about 40 miles (64 km) wide, where large quantities of alluvial gold could be found. With no means of advancing, and threatened by the rising waters of the Orinoco, Raleigh abandoned the expedition, hoping to return at a more favourable time.

In 1616, more than 20 years later, Raleigh received permission from James I to attempt a second expedition to Guiana. He promised the king that he could extract an abundance of gold from a mine near the Caroní that he had heard of during his earlier voyage. James gave Raleigh strict instructions not to engage in hostilities against the Spanish, who still controlled the area around the Orinoco. On reaching South America, Raleigh remained aboard the ship and sent a force headed by Lawrence Kemys to seek out the mine. For unclear reasons, Kemys attacked and captured the Spanish town of Santo Tomé; Raleigh's son Wat was killed in the battle. Unable to find the mine, the men returned to the ship, where Kemys, facing Raleigh's displeasure, committed suicide. Raleigh was put on trial in England, charged with lying about the mine and attempting to stir up conflict between England and Spain, and was executed.

Modern scholars have treated Raleigh's account of El Dorado cautiously. The Discoverie has been interpreted as making Guiana's gold and the supposed city of Manoa seem like plausible future discoveries despite limited proof, relying on second-hand reports and cautious inference to make another English expedition credible. It has also been argued that Raleigh's narrative repeatedly defers the promised discovery. For example, at the expedition's furthest reach, Raleigh turns aside to describe the Caroní waterfalls, while the party sent toward the borders of Guiana disappears from the narrative and later rejoins without any reported discovery.

== Lake Parime ==
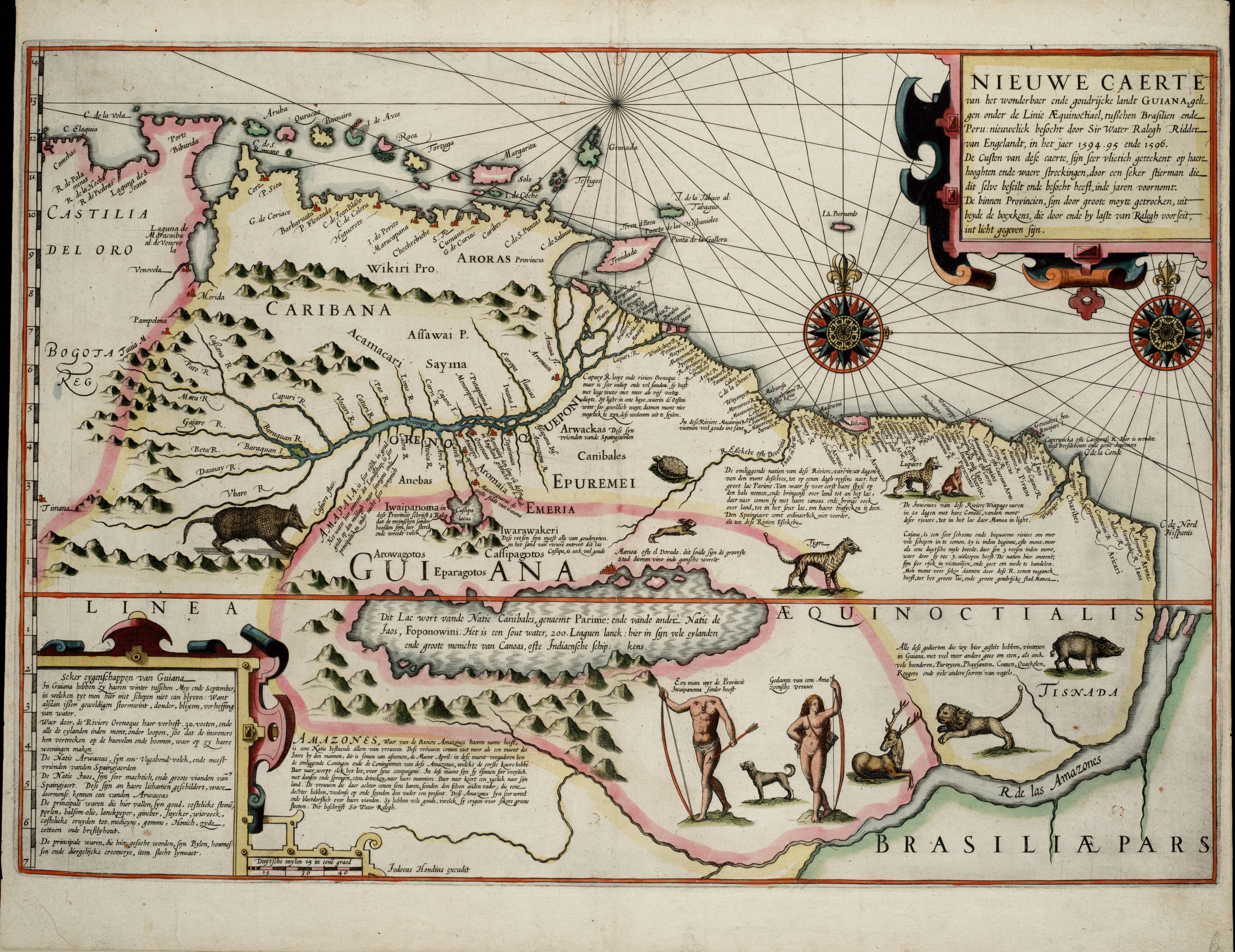
A map of Guiana from 1598, showing Lake Parime

During Berrio's first expedition, he had heard of a vast lake called Manoa, supposedly located in the highlands of the Guianas. El Dorado had long been associated with a lake, so this report strengthened the theory that the fabled golden city lay somewhere east of the Orinoco. In 1596, Lawrence Kemys heard reports of a lake called Parime or Parima, which he assumed to be identical with Manoa; it was said to be so large that the local people "know no difference between it and the main sea". This lake was included in maps of the Guianas throughout the 17th century, although no European had seen it.

In 1674, two Jesuits, Jean Grillet and François Bechamel, traversed the area and found no trace of a lake. In 1740, Nicholas Horstmann found Lake Amucu, a little way south of the supposed location of Lake Parime; Amucu was a reedy lake only a mile wide, with no golden city on its banks. Doubts then began to emerge as to Lake Parime's existence. In 1800, Alexander von Humboldt surveyed the area around the Orinoco and found that "Parime" was the word used by local tribes for any large body of water. He suggested that the seasonal flooding of the plains around Lake Amucu might be the source of the legend. This theory was supported by Robert Schomburgk, who visited Lake Amucu in 1836. Humboldt's influence eventually resulted in the final disappearance of Lake Parime from maps and gazetteers—the effacement, as Schomburgk wrote, "of those last vestiges of that delusive bubble, El Dorado".

== Cultural legacy ==
El Dorado entered European literature as a symbol of fabulous wealth and imagined utopia. In Voltaire's 1759 satire Candide, El Dorado appears as an idealized society whose riches contrast with the violence and greed found elsewhere in the story. In poetry, Edgar Allan Poe's "Eldorado" uses the name as a symbol of an elusive goal. Modern literary criticism has also treated El Dorado as a recurring motif in Latin American fiction; Charlotte Rogers discusses Alejo Carpentier's The Lost Steps in relation to El Dorado in Mourning El Dorado.

The legend also influenced later depictions of obsessive exploration and treasure-seeking. Werner Herzog's 1972 film Aguirre, the Wrath of God follows a Spanish expedition down the Amazon in search of El Dorado. DreamWorks Animation's 2000 film The Road to El Dorado follows two adventurers who search for treasure in the legendary lost city of gold and are mistaken for gods by its inhabitants. The legend has also persisted in modern games and adventure media as a motif associated with lost cities, treasure hunting and colonial fantasy.

== See also ==
- Akakor
- City of the Caesars
- Kingdom of Acaaniba
- Kuhikugu
- La Canela
- Lake Parime
- List of mythological places
- Lost City
- Lost City of Z
- Manuscript 512
- Paititi
- Quivira
- Ratanabá
- Seven Cities of Gold
- Sierra de la Plata

== Bibliography ==
- Aldridge, A. Owen (1975). "Candide: 'A Mixture of Ridicule and Horror'". Voltaire and the Century of Light. Princeton University Press.
- Avellaneda, José Ignacio (1995). The Conquerors of the New Kingdom of Granada. University of New Mexico Press. ISBN 0-8263-1612-3.
- Blanco, John D. (2021). "Presumptions of empire". In Martínez-San Miguel, Y.; Arias, S. (eds.). The Routledge Hispanic Studies Companion to Colonial Latin America and the Caribbean (1492-1898). Routledge.
- Bray, Warwick (1978). The Gold of El Dorado. Times Newspapers Limited. ISBN 0-7230-0226-6.
- Burnett, D. Graham (2000). Masters of All They Surveyed: Exploration, Geography, and a British El Dorado. University of Chicago Press. ISBN 0-226-08120-6.
- Cabrero, Ferran (2020). "Omaguas, primer contacto. Una cultura amazónica elusiva y el misterio de la Aparia menor" [Omaguas, first contact. An elusive Amazonian culture and the mystery of the Lesser Aparia]. Mundo Amazónico. 11 (2): 255–275. doi:10.15446/ma.v11n2.83036.
- Churadze, Eter (March 2022). "On Edgar Allan Poe's 'Eldorado'". Caucasus Journal of Milton Studies. 1 (1).
- Clados, Christiane (2020). "The golden ones". In Halbmayer, Ernst (ed.). Amerindian Socio-Cosmologies Between the Andes, Amazonia and Mesoamerica. Routledge. ISBN 978-0-367-80809-9.
- Francis, J. Michael (2007). Invading Colombia: Spanish Accounts of the Gonzalo Jiménez de Quesada Expedition of Conquest. Pennsylvania State University Press. ISBN 978-0-271-02936-8.
- Friede, Juan (1959). "Geographical Ideas and the Conquest of Venezuela". The Americas. 16 (2): 145–159. doi:10.2307/978838. JSTOR 978838.
- Fuller, Mary C. (1991). "Ralegh's Fugitive Gold: Reference and Deferral in The Discoverie of Guiana". Representations (33). University of California Press: 42–64. JSTOR 2928757.
- Goodman, Edward J. (1975). "The Search for the Mythical Lake Parima". Terrae Incognitae. 7 (1): 23–30. doi:10.1179/tin.1975.7.1.23.
- Hemming, John (1978). The Search for El Dorado. E. P. Dutton. ISBN 0-87690-323-5.
- Hemming, John (1 May 1990). "How Brazil Acquired Roraima". Hispanic American Historical Review. 70 (2): 295–325. doi:10.1215/00182168-70.2.295.
- Hess, Peter, ed. (2021). Violent First Contact in Venezuela: Nikolaus Federmann's 'Indian History'. Pennsylvania State University Press. ISBN 978-0-271-09179-2.
- Jakobsson, M.; Ojeda-Ramirez, S. (2024). "Cursed: A Ludic Genealogy of the Myth of El Dorado". Abstract Proceedings of DiGRA 2024 Conference: Playgrounds.
- Johnson, Amanda Louise (2021). "Nobody's Gold: Sir Walter Ralegh's Discoverie of Guiana and the Rise of Fictionality". Early American Literature. 56 (3). University of North Carolina Press: 699–730. doi:10.1353/eal.2021.0064. JSTOR 27081954.
- Kurella, Doris (1998). "The Muisca: Chiefdoms in Transition". In Redmond, Elsa M. (ed.). Chiefdoms and Chieftaincy in the Americas. University Press of Florida. ISBN 0-8130-1620-7.
- Lacas, M. M. (1953). "A Sixteenth-Century German Colonizing Venture in Venezuela". The Americas. 9 (3): 275–290. doi:10.2307/977995. JSTOR 977995.
- Levy, Buddy (2011). River of Darkness: Francisco Orellana's Legendary Voyage of Death and Discovery Down the Amazon. Bantam Books. ISBN 978-0-553-80750-9.
- Lockhart, James; Schwartz, Stuart B. (1983). Early Latin America: A History of Colonial Spanish America and Brazil. Cambridge Latin American studies. Cambridge University Press. ISBN 978-0-521-23344-6.
- Montenegro, Giovanna (2022). "Germans in the Habsburg Empire in South America (Colonial Venezuela)". Oxford Research Encyclopedia of Latin American History. Oxford University Press. doi:10.1093/acrefore/9780199366439.013.1039. ISBN 978-0-19-936643-9.
- Naipaul, V. S. (2001) [1969]. The Loss of El Dorado: A Colonial History. Picador. ISBN 0-330-48707-8.
- Nicholl, Charles (1995). The Creature in the Map: A Journey to El Dorado. William Morrow and Company. ISBN 0-688-14600-7.
- Petitpierre, Francois (Winter 1975). "The Symbolic Landscape of the Muiscas" (PDF). Studies in Comparative Religion. 9 (1).
- Quintero-Guzmán, Juan Pablo (2023). "El Dorado Offerings in Lake Guatavita: A Muisca Ritual Archaeological Site". Latin American Antiquity. 35 (2): 483–499. doi:10.1017/laq.2023.26.
- Raleigh, Walter (1886) [1596]. The Discovery of Guiana. Cassell & Company.
- Sánchez, Jean-Pierre (1994). "Myths and Legends in the Old World and European Expansionism on the American Continent". In Haase, W.; Reinhold, M. (eds.). The Classical Tradition and the Americas. Vol. 1. De Gruyter. doi:10.1515/9783110870244.189. ISBN 978-3-11-087024-4.
- Sauer, Carl O. (1966). The Early Spanish Main. University of California Press.
- Sellin, Paul R. (2011). Treasure, Treason and the Tower: El Dorado and the Murder of Sir Walter Raleigh. Ashgate. ISBN 978-1-4094-2025-5.
- Uribe Villegas, M. A.; Martinón-Torres, M.; Quintero-Guzmán, J. P. (2021). The Muisca Raft: Context, Materiality and Technology (post-print). University of Cambridge. doi:10.17863/CAM.82268. ISBN 978-0-88402-470-5.
- von Hagen, Victor W. (1974). The Golden Man: A Quest for El Dorado. Book Club Associates. ISBN 978-0-347-00006-2.
