= Antonio Sedeño =

Spanish conquistador and the governor of Trinidad between 1530 and 1538

Antonio Sedeño (died 1538) was a Spanish conquistador and the governor of Trinidad between 1530 and 1538.

By 1514, Ferdinand had named Andres de Haro as manager of the Puerto Rican royal mines and farms, Baltasar de Castro as contador, Antonio as factor, and Diego de Arce as veedor. Baltasar, Antonio and Diego held those positions until at least 1520.

Before his appointment to his position in Trinidad, Sedeño had been the Royal Treasurer of Puerto Rico. He obtained a letters patent from the King appointing him as the Captain and Governor-General of Trinidad on July 12, 1530. He then sailed from the port of Sanlucar de Barrameda, returned to Puerto Rico and arrived in Trinidad on November 8, 1530 with two caravels and seventy men. He landed on the Bay of Erin, which provided shelter and was the only coast of the island known to the Spaniards at the time.

At first, Sedeño treated the natives of the island with "consideration and justice" and was received well by them. He distributed gifts to the indigenous people who came to greet them and the cacique Maruana welcomed him as an ally against other natives. He used the short period of peace to build a fort. The Spaniards' treatment of the natives then turned harsh as their food ran out and they raided the village of Cumucurapo in the north of the island. This prompted fighting which plagued the rest of the years of Sedeño's rule. All the natives except those headed by Maruana then attacked the Spaniards and forced Sedeño to flee. Their fort and arms held out for long enough for them to do so, and Maruana helped them in the process.

Sedeño returned to Puerto Rico and attempted to raise new men and supplies to re-established a presence on Trinidad, which turned out to be difficult as people had heard about the conflict. He went on to Tierra Firme on mainland South America and arrived on land ruled by the chief Turipari. He realized the inconvenience of his settling, and made an agreement with Turipari that supplies could be shipped from Puerto Rico to his land in preparation of a successful entry into Trinidad. Some soldiers had remained on the island and settled in Fort Paria, which was taken by another conquistador, Diego de Ordas. When Sedeño sent a caravel to Paria with new supplies, the ship turned around, fearful of de Ordas, and instead landed in Cumucurapo. The natives appeared welcoming at the beginning, but their mistrust prompted them to attack the new settlers a week later, killing 24 of the 30 men. The six survivors returned to Puerto Rico using the caravel.

Sedeño sailed back to Trinidad in 1532 with 80 men and prevailed the locals in the village of Cumucurapo, which was destroyed and the surviving locals fled to the mountains. However, with the village destroyed, Sedeño had no provisions and so retreated from the island to Margarita. He returned in 1533 a year later and built a stockade in Cumucurapo, but many soldiers became ill and he had to rely on Maruana for supplies. They were attacked on 13 September 1533, and while many Spaniards were killed, they prevailed at the end by counter-attacking on horses.

However, many of his men then left to join Pizarro for Peru. On 27 August 1534, he had to abandon his settlement and go to Fort Paria, where he was imprisoned by de Ordas for six months. After his release, he went to Puerto Rico and gathered a new group of soldiers, this time to go to the mainland in search of El Dorado. He never returned to Trinidad. He died in 1538, allegedly having been poisoned by a female slave. According to the chronicler Gonzalo Fernández de Oviedo, Sedeño "died a very unchristian death", alluding to a fatal end of a sexual affair with his slave.

== Primary Sources ==
- Gonzalo Fernández de Oviedo y Valdés: Historia General y Natural de las Indias. Vol. II, Libro 24, Capitulo II – IV. Madrid 1959.
- Fray Pedro Aguado: Recopilación Historial, Parte 2, Vol. III. Libro 4, Capitulo 7 – 27. Ausgabe Bogotá 1957.
