= Castroverde de Campos =

Coordinates: 41°58′N 5°19′W

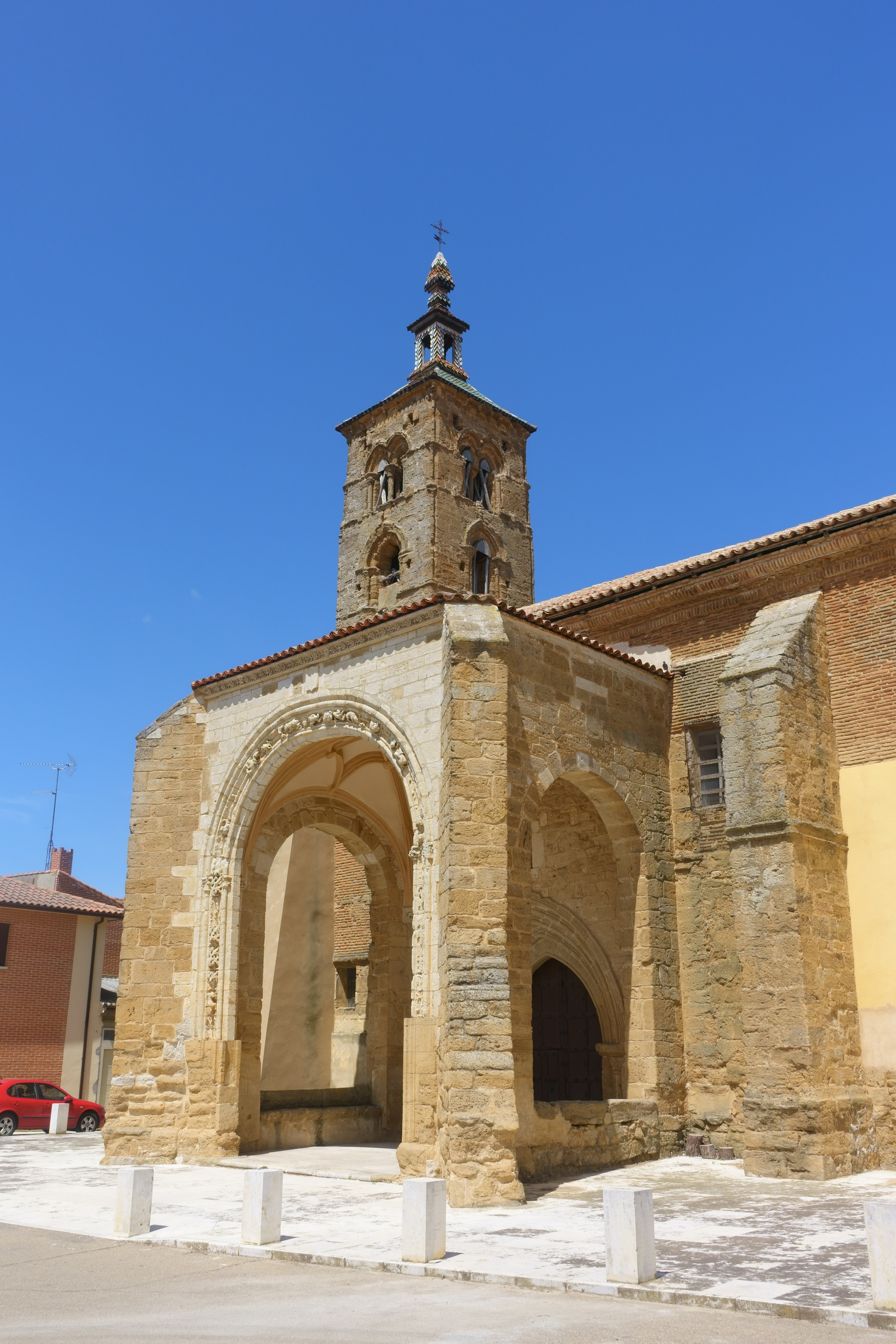

- Coat of arms
- Interactive map of Castroverde de Campos
- Country: Spain
- Autonomous community: Castile and León
- Province: Zamora
- Municipality: Castroverde de Campos

Area
  - Total: 0.1 km^{2} (0.039 sq mi)

Population (2025-01-01)
  - Total: 240
  - Density: 2,400/km^{2} (6,200/sq mi)
- Time zone: UTC+1 (CET)
  - Summer (DST): UTC+2 (CEST)

Castroverde de Campos is a municipality located in the province of Zamora, Castile and León, Spain. According to the 2021 census (INE), the municipality has a population of 272 inhabitants.

== Notable people ==
- Diego de Ordaz (born 1480), Spanish Captain who accompanied Hernán Cortés on his expeditions.

== Local cuisine ==
Castroverde de Campos is home of restaurant Lera, awarded with 1 Michelin star in 2021.
