= Alanís =

Alanís, Spain
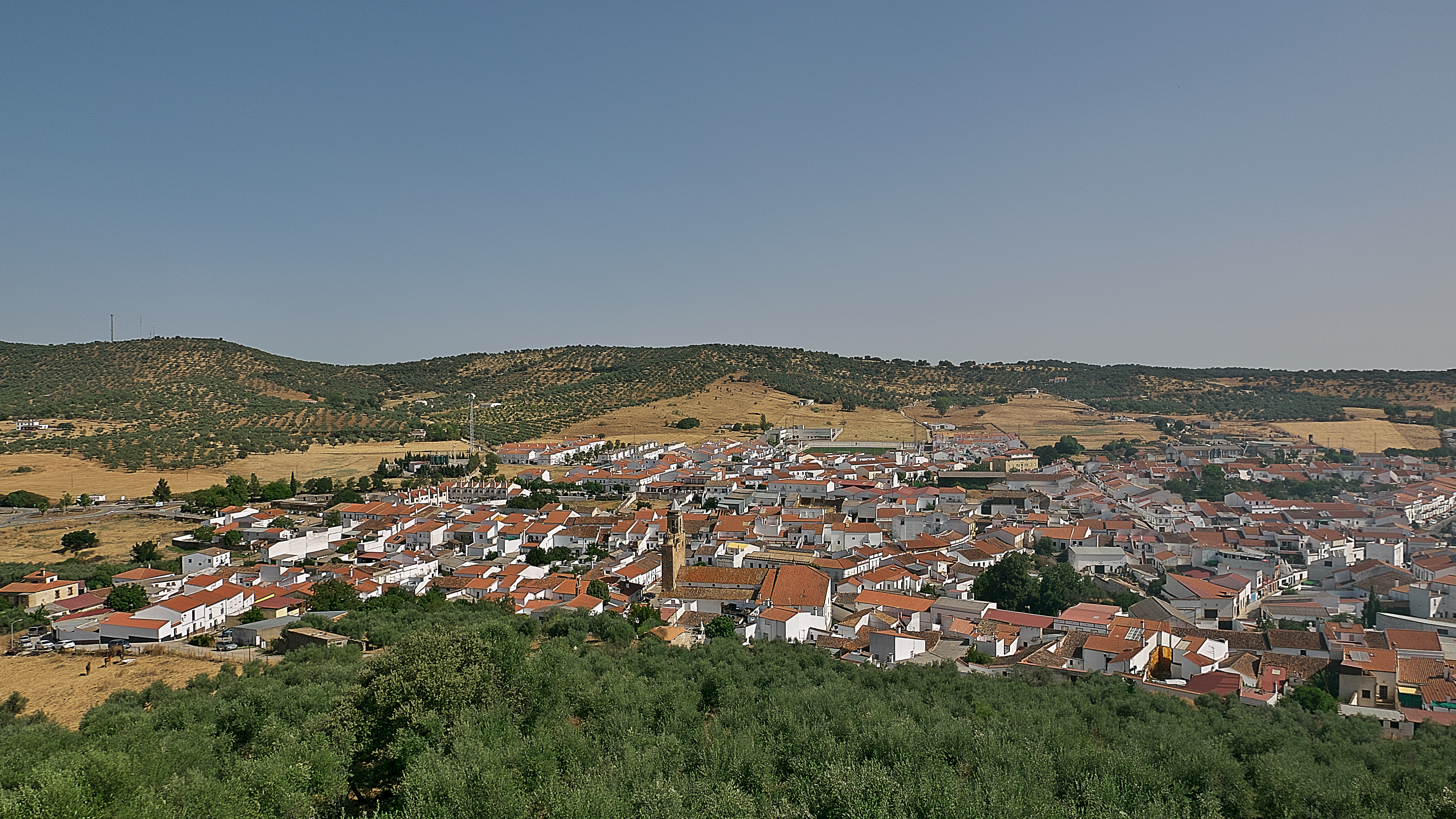

- Flag Coat of arms

- Location within Spain
- Coordinates: 38°02′16.7″N 5°42′49″W
- Country: Spain
- Autonomous Community: Andalucía
- Province: Seville
- Municipality: Alanís

Government
  - Mayor: Ana Rivero (People's Party)

Area
  - Total: 281.11 km^{2} (108.54 sq mi)
- Elevation: 660 m (2,170 ft)

Population (2023)
  - Total: 1,675
  - Density: 5.959/km^{2} (15.43/sq mi)
- Time zone: UTC+1 (CET)
  - Summer (DST): UTC+2 (CEST)
- Postal code: 41380
- Website: Official website

Alanís is a municipality in Seville. In 2005 it had a population of 1,937. It has an area of 280 square kilometers and a population density of 6.9 people per square kilometer. It is located at an altitude of 660 meters and is 106 kilometers from Seville.

== Demographics ==
The population has been steadily decreasing from 1,843 in 2013 to 1,675 at its current population.

Historical population

| Year | Pop. | ±% |
|---|---|---|
| 2013 | 1,843 | — |
| 2014 | 1,832 | −0.6% |
| 2015 | 1,820 | −0.7% |
| 2016 | 1,811 | −0.5% |
| 2017 | 1,781 | −1.7% |
| 2018 | 1,746 | −2.0% |

| Year | Pop. | ±% |
|---|---|---|
| 2019 | 1,723 | −1.3% |
| 2020 | 1,706 | −1.0% |
| 2021 | 1,716 | +0.6% |
| 2022 | 1,689 | −1.6% |
| 2023 | 1,675 | −0.8% |

== Monuments ==
Alanís has several monuments.

=== Religious monuments ===
- Ermita de San Juan (S XIV), which is mudejar. In 1907 it was repaired.
- Ermita de Nuestra Señora de las Angustias. Gothic. Remade in the 18th century.
- Ermita de Ntro Padre Jesus de Nazareno. From the 16th century. It can be visited from 10 AM to 10 PM.
- Iglesia Parroquial Ntra Sra de las Nieves. Important Gothic altarpiece.
- Ermita de San Miguel de la Breña.

=== Other monuments ===
- Castillo de Alanís, of Arabic origin.

== See also ==
- List of municipalities in Seville
