= Félix Mejía =

Spanish journalist, novelist, playwright, and historian

Félix Mejía Fernández-Pacheco (1778, Ciudad Real – 1853, Madrid) was a Spanish journalist, also remembered as a novelist, playwright and historian.
