= Elegías de varones ilustres de Indias =

Epic poem written in the late sixteenth century by Juan de Castellanos

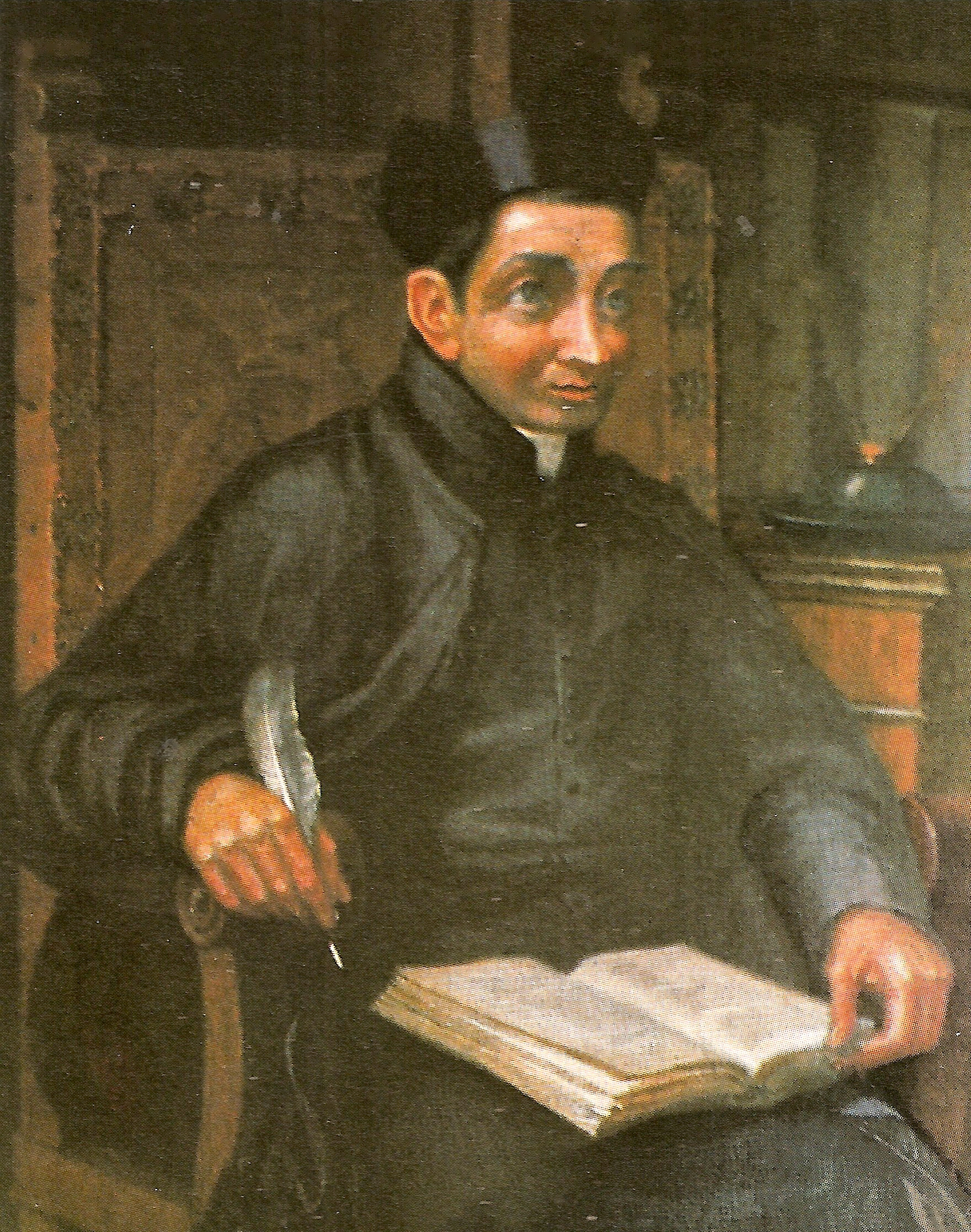
- Juan de Castellanos
- Author: Juan de Castellanos
- Language: Spanish
- Subject: Spanish conquest of Colombia; Spanish conquest of Venezuela indigenous groups in Colombia indigenous groups in Venezuela
- Genre: Poem
- Set in: Colombia, Venezuela
- Publication date: Late 16th century
- Publication place: Colombia
- Pages: 567
- Text: Elegías de varones ilustres de Indias online

Elegías de varones ilustres de Indias (transl. Elegies of illustrious men from the Indies) is an epic poem written in the late sixteenth century by Juan de Castellanos, composed between the late 16th and early 17th centuries. The work represents one of the most extensive literary testimonies of the Spanish conquest of the Americas, with an estimated length of around 150,000 hendecasyllabic verses.

The Elegías draw inspiration from epic works such as La Araucana by Alonso de Ercilla, adopting its technique and narrative structure, while shifting the geographical focus from Chile to the New Kingdom of Granada. Although it has literary value, the poem is chiefly of historiographical importance, as it constitutes one of the richest and most detailed sources for the history of the early phases of the Spanish conquest in Colombia and surrounding territories.

== Description ==
The work gives a detailed account of the colonization of the Caribbean and the territories in present-day Colombia and Venezuela. It describes the settlement companies and foundation of cities as well as vivid depictions of indigenous cultures, such as the Muisca, and natural history, making this text an important early chronicle of the Spanish colonization of the Americas. Besides its historical value, it is notable for the use of multiple Renaissance-era literary styles, including the elegy, epic, pilgrimage tale, pastoral romance, chivalric romance and other literary forms.

The book contains one of the earliest descriptions of the New World species potato (Solanum colombianum), an unknown plant in the Old World before the discovery of the Americas by Europeans.

The poem is divided into four parts, written in ottava rima, in which the author recounts episodes of the discovery and conquest of the West Indies, with particular attention to the New Kingdom of Granada (present-day Colombia).

- First part: deals with the voyages of Christopher Columbus, and the discovery and conquest of the islands of Cuba, Puerto Rico, Trinidad, and other Caribbean regions.
- Second part: devoted to expeditions in Venezuela, to Cabo de la Vela, and to Santa Marta.
- Third part: narrates the conquest and history of Cartagena de Indias, Popayán, Antioquia, and Chocó.
- Fourth part: describes events related to the conquest of Bogotá, Tunja, the Guane territories, and the political affairs of the New Kingdom of Granada.

Alongside the historical reconstruction, Castellanos includes numerous biographies of conquistadors, among them those of Pedro de Ursúa and the rebel Lope de Aguirre, as well as descriptions of customs, ways of life, and natural environments of the American continent.

== Editorial ==
The first part was published in Madrid in 1589. The first three parts were published together only in 1847, in volume IV of the Biblioteca de Autores Españoles. The fourth part, entitled Historia del Nuevo Reino de Granada, was edited in Madrid in 1886–1887 by Antonio Paz y Melia, in the collection Escritores castellanos. A notable episode concerns the “Discurso del capitán Francisco Drake”, originally included in the third part and devoted to the attack of the English privateer Francis Drake on Cartagena in 1586. This episode was excluded from print for reasons of censorship and appeared only in 1847 thanks to a previously unpublished manuscript.

== See also ==
- Spanish conquest of the Muisca
- Gonzalo Jiménez de Quesada, El Carnero
