= Diego de Ordaz =

Spanish explorer

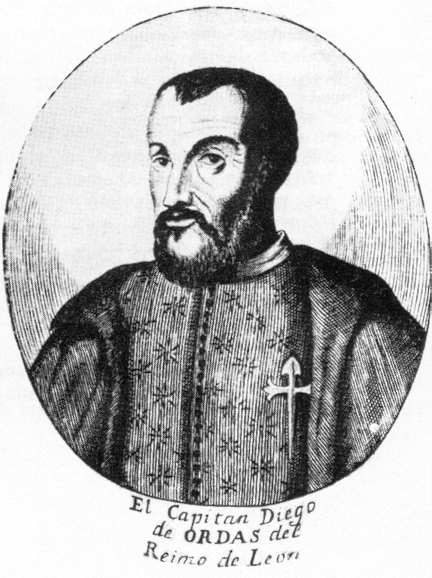
Captain Diego de Ordás, of the Kingdom of León

Diego de Ordaz, also Diego de Ordás (Spanish: [ˈdjeɣo ðe oɾˈðaθ]; 1480–1532), was a Spanish explorer and soldier.

== Early career ==
Diego de Ordaz was born in 1480 in Castroverde de Campos, Zamora province, Spain. He arrived in Cuba at a young age. Serving under the orders of Diego Velázquez, he participated in the earliest exploratory expeditions to Colombia and Panama.

According to Bernal Díaz del Castillo, he was a stutterer.

== Expedition of Cortés to Mexico ==
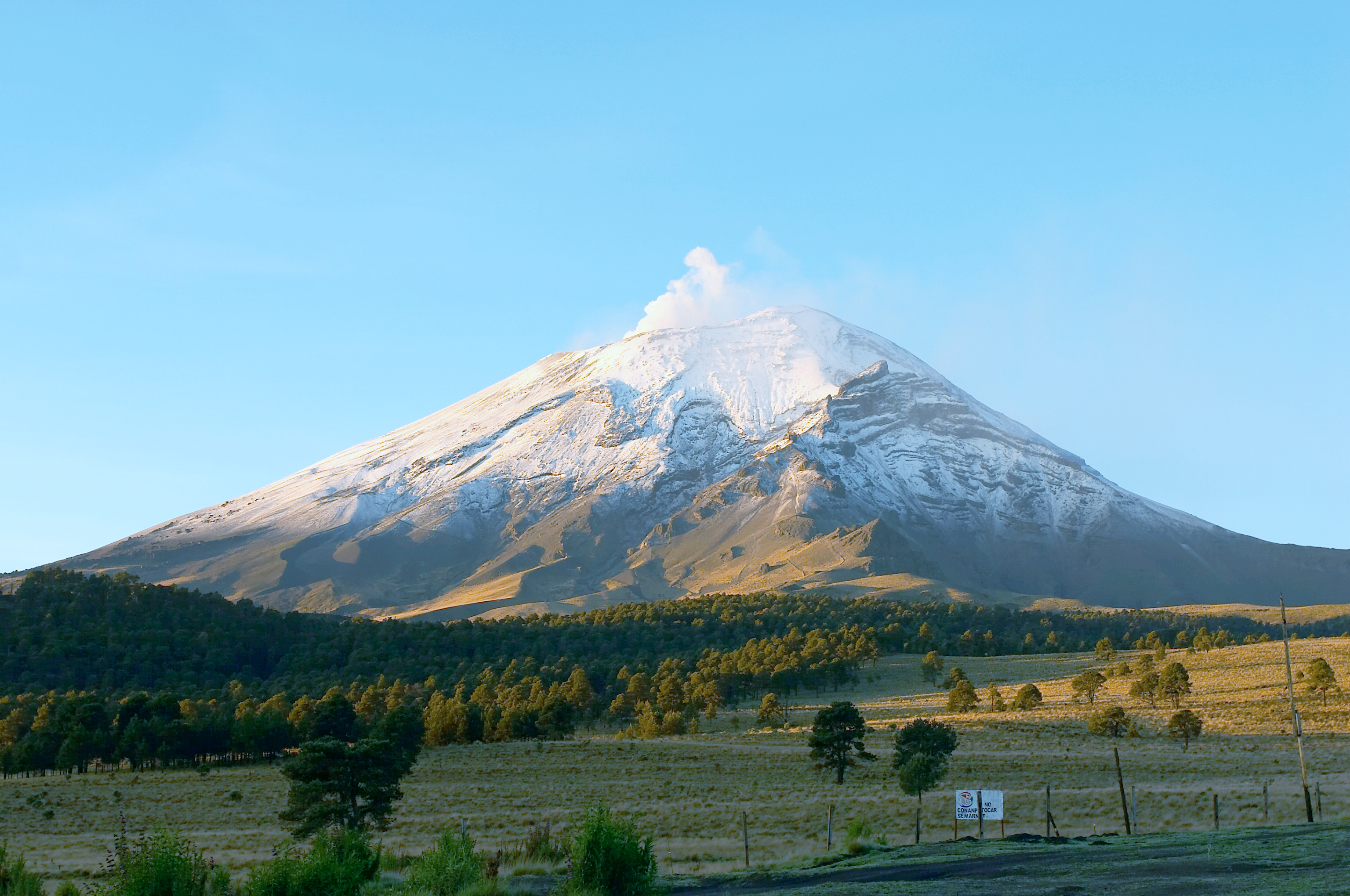
Popocatépetl

Captain De Ordaz accompanied Hernán Cortés on his expedition of conquest to the Mexican mainland. He was recognized for his contribution to the victory over the Aztecs obtained at the Battle of Centla near Río Grijalva in Tabasco on March 25, 1519.

Together with two comrades, he was the first European to climb to the top of the volcano Popocatépetl - a feat which made a great impression on the indigenous allies accompanying Cortés. In recognition of De Ordaz's military deeds, on October 22, 1525, the emperor Charles V issued a decree permitting him to use a coat-of-arms featuring a view of the volcano.

For his work against Aztec abuse on the people of Coatzacoalcos, Ordaz received one of their indigenous princesses as a wife.

Captain De Ordaz participated in the Spanish conquest of Tenochtitlán, the Aztec capital. When - prior to the final conquest - the Spaniards were forced to flee from the capital in a nocturnal action known as La Noche Triste ("the sad night"), De Ordaz was wounded.

Following the conquest of Mexico, De Ordaz explored the areas of Oaxaca and Veracruz, and navigated the Río Coatzacoalos.

In 1521 he was sent back to Spain in order to present the story of the conquest of Mexico to the Spanish court and in order to obtain for Cortés the title of Governor and General Captain of New Spain.

== Search for El Dorado ==
Captain De Ordaz returned to North America in approximately 1525. In 1529, he was granted the property of El Peñón de los Baños located within the limits of Mexico City.

He returned again to Spain and was appointed "Governor of the Islands in the Rio Marañon", the estuary area of the Amazon River (discovered by Vicente Yáñez Pinzón in 1500, but not explored since). Unable to find the Amazon, Ordáz traveled the Orinoco River more than 1000 miles. During his travels, he learned from the natives of an El Dorado-like kingdom known as Meta (possibly the same location as the Manõa recorded in secondary sources) said to exist beyond a mountain on left bank of the Orinoco River. After failing to find Manõa, he decided to return to Spain but died in 1532 on the Atlantic.

== Legacy ==
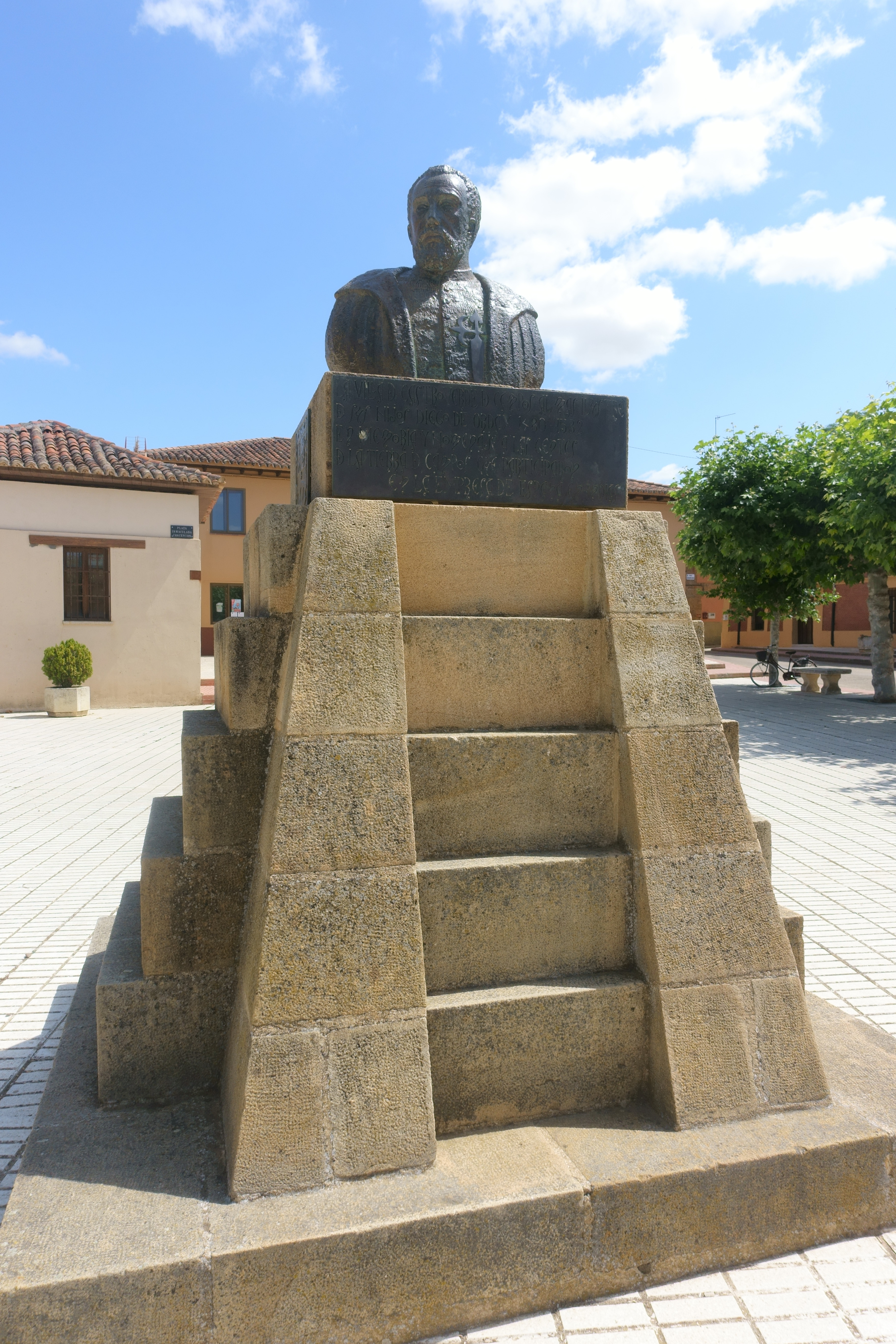
Monument to Diego de Ordaz in Castroverde de Campos

In 1952, a planned city called Puerto Ordaz was founded in Venezuela on the banks of the Orinoco River; today it is one of that country's principal cities.

Diego de Ordaz was one of the principal characters in the anonymous historical novel Jicoténcal published in Philadelphia in 1826 and attributed to several different writers like Felix Varela, José María Heredia, and Félix Mejía.

== Literature ==
Fundamental primary sources to the voyage of Ordáz on the Orinoco are:

- Gonzalo Fernández de Oviedo y Valdés: Historia General y Natural de las Indias. Vol. II, Libro 24, CapitulosII – IV. Madrid 1959, pp. 388–399.
- Juan de Castellanos: Elegías de varones ilustres de Indias. Elegía IX, Canto 1. 2. Bogotá 1997, pp. 159–173.

Besides, but mingled with second-hand information:

- Fray Pedro Aguado: Recopilación Historial, Parte 2, Vol. III. Libro 4, Capitulo 7–19. Bogotá 1957, pp. 303–351.
