= Timeline of Colombian history =

This is a timeline of Colombian history, comprising important legal and territorial changes, political events, and milestones relating to Colombia and its predecessor states and cultures. To read about the background to these events, see History of Colombia.

== BC ==
Year	Event
10500 BC	El Abra culture inhabits the Altiplano Cundiboyacense.
9000 BC	Communities of hunter-gatherers are established in the regions of Tequendama, El Abra, Nemocón, Tibitó, Vistahermosa, Galindo, Aguazuque, Gachetá and Sueva.
3000 BC	Inhabitants change to a semi-sedentary life. The first crops of cassava on the Caribbean coast and maize in the Altiplano Cundiboyacense are grown. Archaeological sites in Puerto Hormiga show human activity.
2700 BC	Inhabitants develop agriculture in the Amazon.
1600 BC	The Morro del Tulcán pyramid is built.
1590 BC	The Ilama culture develops near the Calima River in the Valle del Cauca.
1300 BC	The Chimitá petroglyphs in modern-day Santander Department are created.
1270 BC	The Zipacón pottery is created.
700 BC	Cave paintings are created near the Inírida River in modern-day Vichada Department.
700 BC	The Quimbaya's formative stage occurs.
700 BC	El Infiernito menhirs is built.
300 BC	Malagana period
300 BC	The Guayabero Cave paintings in modern-day Guaviare are created.
300 BC	First type of Colombian cheese was made by an ancient civilization.
200 BC	San Agustín culture
100 BC	Tairona culture

== 1st century ==
Year	Event
100	Early Zenú culture

== 3rd century ==
Year	Event
300	the Chibcha civilization expands from the northern Andes including part of what is now Panama, the high plains of the Eastern Sierra of Colombia the areas of modern departments of Santander (North and South), Boyacá and Cundinamarca, becoming the most populous zone between the Mayan and Inca Empires.

== 6th century ==
Year	Event
600	Classic Quimbaya civilization. Poporo Quimbaya
600	Tierradentro culture

== 7th century ==
Year	Event
700	Late Zenú culture

== 10th century ==
Year	Event
1000	Classic Muisca period. Muisca raft

== 15th century ==
Year	Event
~1450	Meicuchuca becomes zipa of Bacatá (to 1470).
~1450	Hunzahúa becomes zaque of Hunza (to 1470).
1470	Saguamanchica becomes zipa of Bacatá (to 1490).
1470	Michuá becomes zaque of Hunza (to 1490).
1490	Battle of Chocontá
1490	Nemequene becomes zipa of Bacatá (to 1514).
1490	Quemuenchatocha becomes zaque of Hunza (to 1537).
1492	Inca Empire invades southwest Colombia.
1498	Spanish explorer Juan de la Cosa lands on what is today called Cabo de la Vela (Cape of Sails) in the Guajira Peninsula.
1500	Rodrigo de Bastidas lands on the Colombian Caribbean coast.

== 16th century ==
Year	Date	Event
1502	2 May	Alonso de Ojeda arrives at Bahía Honda and founded the village of Santa Cruz, first city in Colombia
1508		Diego de Enciso and Vasco Núñez de Balboa founded the village of Santa María la Antigua del Darién, initially called The Antigua
1509		Ojeda founded the village of San Sebastián de Urabá
1509		Indigenous princess India Catalina is abducted by Spanish conqueror Diego de Nicuesa from a Calamari indigenous settlement
1510		Spanish conquerors discover San Andres y Providencia islands
1513	25 September	Núñez de Balboa discovers the Pacific Ocean
1514	12 April	The Pedrarias Dávila expedition began
1514		Tisquesusa becomes zipa of Bacatá (till 1537)
1518	2 December	Vasco Núñez de Balboa is executed by orders of Pedrarias Dávila
1525	29 July	Rodrigo de Bastidas founded the village of Santa Marta
1530	3 May	Foundation of Santa Cruz de Mompox by Alonso de Heredia
1533	20 January	Pedro de Heredia founded the village of Cartagena de Indias
1536	6 April	The strenuous Spanish conquest expedition starts from Santa Marta
1536	25 July	Sebastián de Belalcázar founded the village of Santiago de Cali
1537		Foundation of St. Juan de Pasto by Lorenzo de Aldana
1537	March	Gonzalo Jiménez de Quesada with his troops reach the Muisca Confederation
1537	20 April	zipa Tisquesusa is beaten in the Spanish conquest of the Muisca at Funza
1537		Sagipa becomes the last zipa of Bacatá
1537	25 July	Francisco César discovers the territory of Antioquia
1537	20 August	zaque Quemuenchatocha is beaten in Hunza.
1537		Aquiminzaque becomes the last zaque of Hunza.
1537	September	The Sun Temple in Sogamoso (name in Muysccubun: Sugamuxi) was burned by Spanish soldiers
1538	6 August	Gonzalo Jiménez de Quesada founded the city of Santa fe de Bogotá *some historians argue that the date of foundation was on 27 April 1539
1538	20 August	The Panche are beaten by an alliance of zipa Sagipa and Spanish conquistadors in the Battle of Tocarema
1539		Cacica Gaitana starts the Paezan revolt against the Spanish conquest
1539		Neiva is founded by Juan de Cabrera.
1539		Honda, Tolima is founded by Gonzalo Jiménez de Quesada.
1539	6 August	Gonzalo Suárez Rendón founded the city of Tunja
1540	27 July	King Carlos V appointed Santa Fe de Bogotá the title of city
1541	24 August	Jerónimo Luis Tejelo discovers the Aburrá Valley
1542		Francisco de Orellana sails the length of the Amazon River
1545		Foundation of Riohacha by Nikolaus Federmann
1549	17 July	Emperor Carlos V, created the Royal Audiencia of Santa Fe, subdivided into districts including the "New Kingdom Provinces": Santa Marta, Río de San Juan, Popayán, bordering with Quito, Guayana o Dorado and Cartagena de Indias. Pamplona was founded.
1550	6 January	Hernando de Santana founded the village of Valle de Upar
1550		Foundation of Ibagué by Andres Lopez de Galarza
1556	7 April	The Real Audiencia de Santafé is officially installed
1572		Foundation of Villa de Leyva by Hernan Suarez de Villalobos
1580	7 December	The first recorded eruption of the Galeras volcano occurs.
1588	4 November	Cartagena de Indias is affected by a hurricane. (to 6 November)
1596		English corsair Francis Drake attacks Riohacha
1600	19 February	Huaynaputina volcano in Peru erupted catastrophically, in the largest volcanic explosion in South America in historic times causing a volcanic winter, with deadly effects reaching as far as Russia

== 17th century ==
Year	Date	Event
1610	5 February	the Catholic Monarchs established from Spain the Spanish Inquisition Holy Office Court in Cartagena de Indias
1629		Foundation of Barranca de San Nicolas (Later Barranquilla ) by Galapa indigenous people
1631		Foundation of Girón, Santander by Francisco Mantilla de los Rios
1650		Approximated date of painting of the Sopo Archangels
1675		Foundation of Medellín by Francisco Herrera Campuzano

== 18th century ==
Year	Date	Event
1711	6 August	Death of painter Gregorio Vasquez de Arce y Ceballos
1717		The Viceroyalty of New Granada is originally created, and then it was temporarily removed, to finally be reestablished in 1739
1719	13 June	Antonio Ignacio de la Pedrosa y Guerrero is Viceroy of New Granada
1724	11 May	Jorge de Villalonga is Viceroy of New Granada
1740	24 April	Sebastián de Eslava is Viceroy of New Granada
1740		Revolt of the Comuneros (New Granada)
1749	24 September	José Alfonso Pizarro is Viceroy of New Granada
1753	24 November	José Solís Folch de Cardona is Viceroy of New Granada
1756		The viceroyalty of New Granada is allowed to fabricate its own coins. The House of Coins "Casa de la Moneda" is built
1761		Pedro Messía de la Cerda is Viceroy of New Granada
1772		Manuel de Guirior is Viceroy of New Granada
1773		Foundation of San Jose de Cúcuta by Juana Rangel de Cuellar
1776	26 November	Manuel Antonio Flores is Viceroy of New Granada
1780		Manuela Beltrán organized a peasant revolt against excessive taxation
1782	1 April	Juan de Torrezar Díaz Pimienta is Viceroy of New Granada
1782		Antonio Caballero y Góngora is Viceroy of New Granada
1783		José Celestino Mutis leads the Royal Botanical Expedition to New Granada.
1786		Death of indigenous leader Cacique Calarcá in combats against the Spanish forces in Peñas Blancas
1788		Francisco Gil de Taboada y Lemos is Viceroy of New Granada
1789		José Manuel de Ezpeleta is Viceroy of New Granada
1797	2 January	Pedro Mendinueta y Múzquiz is Viceroy of New Granada
1799		Research expedition of Alexander von Humboldt exploring the courses of the Orinoco River and Magdalena River

== 19th century ==
Year	Date	Event
1803		San Andres y Providencia islands are annexed to the Viceroyalty of New Granada
1810	20 July	Cry of Independence, also known as the Florero de Llorente (Llorente Flower Vase) incident (Colombian Independence Day)
1810	25 July	José Miguel Pey de Andrade is President of the Supreme Governing Junta
1810	17 September	The president of the Supreme Board of Cartagena, José María García Toledo, created the Colombian Navy
1811		Antonio Nariño publishes the first Newspaper in Colombia, "La Bagatela"
1811	1 April	Jorge Tadeo Lozano is declared President of Cundinamarca and Vicegerent of the King's Person
1811	1 April	Antonio Nariño is declared President of Cundinamarca and Vicegerent of the King's Person
1811	11 November	Cartagena de Indias declared its complete independence from Spain
1812	1 April	Manuel Rodríguez Torices is President of the State of Cartagena de Indias
1812	19 August	Manuel Benito de Castro is declared President of Cundinamarca and Vicegerent of the King's Person
1814	14 May	Manuel de Bernardo Álvarez del Casal is declared President of Cundinamarca and Vicegerent of the King's Person
1814	5 October	José Luis Álvaro Alvino Fernández Madrid, is president of the United Provinces of the New Granada.
1815	21 January	Custodio García Rovira is president of the United Provinces of the New Granada. he was executed 1 month later by Pablo Morillo.
1815	28 March	José Miguel Pey de Andrade is President of the United Provinces of the New Granada
1815	17 August	Antonio Villavicencio is President of the United Provinces of the New Granada
1815	15 November	Camilo Torres Tenorio is President of the United Provinces of the New Granada
1816	22 June	Liborio Mejía is president of the United Provinces of the New Granada making him the youngest person to ever hold the presidency of Colombia at the age of 24. He was executed three months later during the Reconquest led by the Spaniard Pablo Morillo.
1816	16 July	Manuel Fernando Serrano Uribe is the last president of the United Provinces of the New Granada before its dissolution and complete Reconquest.
1816	28 October	Execution of Francisco José de Caldas
1817	14 November	Execution of Policarpa Salavarrieta
1818	25 September	Doña Manuela Sáenz de Thorne saves Simón Bolívar from an attempted assassination
1819	5 February	The Congress of Angostura
1819	25 July	Battle of Vargas Swamp
1819	7 August	Battle of Boyacá
1819	11 October	For order of Francisco de Paula Santander, Spanish colonel Jose Maria Barreiro and 38 Spanish officers were executed in Bogotá.
1821	30 August	Congress of Cúcuta and Constitution of Cúcuta
1828	27 August	After the failure of the constitutional convention of Ocaña Simón Bolívar proclaimed himself dictator, through the "Organic Decree of Dictatorship".
1830		The Federation of Gran Colombia is dissolved
1830	15 September	Rafael José de Urdaneta y Faría is Provisional Chief of the Government of the Republic of Gran Colombia
1830	17 December	Simón Bolívar dies in Quinta de San Pedro Alejandrino near Santa Marta
1831	2 May	Joaquín Mariano Mosquera y Arboleda is President of the Republic of New Granada
1832	10 March	José Ignacio de Márquez is President of the Republic of New Granada
1832	7 October	Francisco de Paula Santander is President of the Republic of New Granada
1832	7 October	Coat of arms of Colombia is officially adopted
1835		Start the Colombian coffee industry with the first commercial crops in Norte de Santander
1837		Colombian peso replaces Colombian real as official currency
1839		The War of the Supremes (Spanish: Guerra de los Supremos, also called the Guerra de los Conventos) extended from 1839 to 1841, caused by the ambitions of various regional leaders (gamonales) to seize power and depose President José Ignacio de Márquez
1840		Foundation of Villavicencio by Esteban Aguirre
1841	1 April	Pedro Alcántara Herrán is President of the Republic of New Granada
1845	1 April	Tomás Cipriano de Mosquera is President of the Republic of New Granada
1849		Foundation of Manizales by Antioquian colonists
1849	1 April	José Hilario López is President of the Republic of New Granada
1851	14 October	José de Obaldía is President of the Republic of New Granada
1853	1 April	José María Obando is President of the Republic of New Granada
1853	1 April	Manuel María Mallarino is President of the Republic of New Granada
1854	17 April	José María Melo is President of the Republic of New Granada
1856	11 June	Creation of the Sovereign State of Antioquía
1857	15 June	The Law of 15 June 1857, created the other states that would go on to form the Granadine Confederation: The Sovereign State of Bolívar, The Sovereign State of Santander, The Sovereign State of Cauca, and The Sovereign State of Magdalena
1858		The Granadine Confederation is created.
1858	22 May	Mariano Ospina Rodríguez is president of the Granadine Confederation
1860	8 May	Newly appointed Supreme Director of War Tomas Cipriano de Mosquera declared the Sovereign State of Cauca a separate nation from the Granadine Confederation and Colombian Civil War (1860–1862) broke out
1861	1 April	Bartolomé Calvo is President of the Granadine Confederation
1861	18 July	Tomás Cipriano de Mosquera is President of the Granadine Confederation
1863		Foundation of Pereira, Colombia by Remigio Antonio Cañarte
1863		The name of the Republic is changed officially to "United States of Colombia" through the Rionegro Constitution
1863	14 May	Tomás Cipriano de Mosquera is the first President of the United States of Colombia
1863	26 November	The Flag of Colombia is officially adopted
1864	8 April	Manuel Murillo Toro is President of the United States of Colombia
1865		Kola Román, a popular Colombian soft drink is introduced by Carlos Roman
1866	1 April	José María Rojas Garrido is President of the United States of Colombia
1866	22 May	Tomás Cipriano de Mosquera is President of the United States of Colombia for second time
1867		Foundation of Leticia, Colombia by Benigno Bustamante
1867	12 May	Joaquín Riascos is President of the United States of Colombia
1867	23 May	Manuel María de los Santos Acosta is President of the United States of Colombia
1868	1 April	Santos Gutiérrez is President of the United States of Colombia
1870	1 April	Eustorgio Salgar is President of the United States of Colombia
1872	1 April	Manuel Murillo Toro is President of the United States of Colombia for second time
1874		Santiago Pérez de Manosalbas is President of the United States of Colombia
1876	1 April	Aquileo Parra is President of the United States of Colombia
1878	1 April	Julián Trujillo Largacha is President of the United States of Colombia
1880	8 April	Rafael Nuñez is President of the United States of Colombia
1882	1 April	Francisco Javier Zaldúa served as President of the Rionegro Convention, a constituent assembly that created the United States of Colombia (now Colombia). As President of this legislative body, Zaldúa became the de facto President of the United States of Colombia for 6 days, when President Tomás Cipriano de Mosquera ceded executive power to the convention, and until the said convention elected a Council of Ministers to serve collectively as the Colombian head of state.
1882	22 December	José Eusebio Otalora is President of the United States of Colombia, in his capacity as the Second Presidential Designate following the death of President Francisco Javier Zaldúa, and the non-acceptance of the office by the First Designate Rafael Núñez.
1884	1 April	Ezequiel Hurtado is President of the United States of Colombia
1884	11 August	Rafael Nuñez is President of the United States of Colombia for second time
1884	28 August	ETB (company) is created, being the first telecommunications company in Colombia
1886		President Rafael Nuñez creates the Colombian Constitution of 1886, which has been one of the longest lasting constitutions in the western hemisphere, and with the Reforms of 1910, 1936, 1958, 1968, 1973 and 1986 was the constitution of Colombia until 1991. The country adopts its present name: "Republic of Colombia"
1886	1 April	on 30 March 1886, president Núñez presented his resignation to Congress due to his poor health condition caused by dysentery. José María Campo Serrano is sworn in as Acting President, becoming the first President of Colombian Republic
1887	7 January	Eliseo Payán is the 2nd president of Colombia
1887	4 June	Rafael Nuñez is the 3rd President of Colombia
1888		Carlos Holguín Mallarino is the 4th President of Colombia
1889	14 October	Foundation of Villa Holguin (Later Armenia, Colombia ) by Jesus Maria Ocampo
1891	5 November	Colombian National Police is created
1892	7 August	Miguel Antonio Caro is the 4th president of Colombia
1892	29 September	Rafael Nuñez is the 5th President of Colombia
1894	18 September	Miguel Antonio Caro is the 6th president of Colombia
1896	26 May	Poet José Asunción Silva commits suicide
1898		Manuel Antonio Sanclemente is the 7th president of Colombia
1899	17 October	The Thousand Days' War (1899–1902)(1130 days) (Spanish: Guerra de los Mil Días)
1900	26 May	President Manuel Antonio Sanclemente extended the deadline for completion of the Panama Canal from 31 October 1904 to 31 October 1910. The executive decree was granted without consent of the Colombian Congress.
1900	26 May	Battle of Palonegro
1900	19 June	Date of death of Salvador Camacho, called the "founder of sociology" in Colombia.
1900	31 July	José Manuel Marroquín is president of Colombia
1900	August	Naturalist Soto Grimshaw dies of cholera during an expedition to the Caribbean region of Colombia

== 20th century ==
Year	Date	Event
1901		Colombian Geographer Francisco Javier Vergara y Velasco publishes the first complete cartographic charts of the country, the Atlas completo de geografía colombiana (1906–1910), through which he won the Charles Manoir price of the Paris Geographical Society.
1901		Manuelita became the first Colombian sugar mill to move from mule to steam powered mills
1901	23 February	Battle of Aguadulce
1902	24 October	The Thousand Days' War was a civil war fought in Colombia from 17 October 1899 to 21 November 1902, at first between the Liberal Party and the government led by the National Party, and later – after the Conservative Party had ousted the National Party – between the liberals and the conservative government. The peace treaty was signed on the plantation Neerlandia on 24 October 1902.
1903		Panama remained as a province of Colombia until this year, when – with backing from the United States in exchange for allowing the US to build the Panama Canal – it became independent (Separation of Panama from Colombia)
1903	22 January	The United States and the Republic of Colombia sign the Hay–Herrán Treaty
1903	26 October	The United States Navy patrol gunboat USS Nashville blocks Colombian attempts to suppress the Panamanian separatist movement
1904	16 June	Date of death of Manuel Uribe Ángel, known for his great contributions to the advances of the practice of medicine in Colombia and the Antioquia Department. He also served as President of the then Sovereign State of Antioquia
1904	7 August	Rafael Reyes is president of Colombia
1904	11 October	Creation of Postobón soft drinks company
1910		Colombian astronomer Julio Garavito Armero discovers the crater on the Moon's far side which is named after him (Garavito crater).
1910	7 August	Carlos Eugenio Restrepo is president of Colombia
1914	7 August	José Vicente Concha is president of Colombia
1915	9 May	Indigenous nasa leader Quintín Lame is arrested for attempting the creation of an indigenous independent republic
1918		Marco Fidel Suárez is president of Colombia
1926		Miguel Abadía Méndez is president of Colombia
1927		The Federación Nacional de Cafeteros de Colombia is created
1928	6 December	The Banana massacre, in Spanish, Matanza de las bananeras or Masacre de las bananeras: A massacre of workers for the United Fruit Company that occurred in the town of Ciénaga near Santa Marta
1930		Enrique Olaya Herrera is president of Colombia
1932	1 September	The Colombia–Peru War
1934		Alfonso López Pumarejo is president of Colombia
1934		First census in Colombia. Population:8.700.000
1935	24 June	Argentine singer Carlos Gardel dies in a plane crash in Medellín
1938		Eduardo Santos Montejo is president of Colombia
1942		Alfonso López Pumarejo is president of Colombia for a second time
1945	29 April	Date of death of impressionist painter Andrés de Santa Maria
1945		Alberto Lleras Camargo is president of Colombia
1946		Mariano Ospina Pérez is president of Colombia
1948	9 April	Murder of politician Jorge Eliécer Gaitán. Bogotazo riots. Starts the bipartisan violence ("La Violencia")
1950		Laureano Gómez Castro is president of Colombia
1953	13 June	Gustavo Rojas Pinilla seized power by means of a coup d'état
1954	3 August	President Rojas Pinilla government gives women the right to vote
1954		Rojas Pinilla introduced the Television in Colombia
1955		Rojas Pinilla ordered a military offensive against rearmed peasants triggering a confrontation known as the "Guerra de Villarrica" (War of Villarrica) which took place in the central town of Villarrica in Tolima Department.
1956	24 June	the Liberal Party headed by Alberto Lleras Camargo and the Conservative Party headed by Laureano Gómez signed an accord on 24 June 1956 to begin the National Front (Colombia).
1958		Dr. Jorge Reynolds Pompo is credited with having helped in the design of the first successful internal pacemaker
1960		Creation of the first Natural protected area in Colombia, the Cueva de los Guacharos National park
1961	28 October	Hurricane Hattie moves over San Andrés island with winds of 80 mph (130 km/h), causing 1 death, 15 injuries, and $300,000 in damage (1961 USD, $2.1 million 2008 USD).
1962		Guillermo León Valencia is president of Colombia
1962	25 July	Luz Marina Zuluaga wins Miss Universe beauty contest
1964		The refractive surgery keratomileusis was developed by Ignacio Barraquer in Bogotá.
1964	May	Marquetalia Republic is overrun by the Colombian army (during what was termed "Operation Marquetalia")
1965	7 January	The National Liberation Army (Colombia) (ELN) guerrilla is created
1966		Carlos Lleras Restrepo is president of Colombia
1970		Misael Pastrana Borrero is president of Colombia
1972		Discovery of Ciudad Perdida archaeological place
1974		Alfonso López Michelsen is president of Colombia
1974		The Black Tuna Gang, a Miami-based Colombian marijuana-trafficking group was responsible for bringing in over 500 tons of marijuana over a 16-month period in the mid-1970s ("the marijuana bonanza").
1976	December	Starts the development of Cerrejón Coal mine. It is the largest mining operation in Colombia and among the largest open-pit coal mines in the world
1978		Julio César Turbay Ayala is president of Colombia
1980	27 February	Dominican embassy siege
1980	June	Serial killer Pedro López a.k.a. Monster of the Andes confessed to over 300 murders
1981		Homosexuality in Colombia is declared legal by the national government
1982		Belisario Betancur is elected president of Colombia
1982		Paramilitary group "Muerte a Secuestradores" (MAS) is formed
1982		Antioquian entrepreneur Felix Correa and his bank FURATENA get convicted for financial fraud causing a collapse in the national financial system
1982	1 September	Mother Teresa visits Colombia
1982	22 October	Gabriel García Márquez wins the Nobel Prize in Literature
1982	26 October (formalized on 5 November)	Colombia resigns as host for the 1986 FIFA World Cup due to scarcity of public resources
1983		Pablo Escobar attends Colombian congress sessions as backup of congressman Jairo Ortega
1983		President Betancur announces Colombia has signed in the Non-Aligned Movement
1983		Businessman Roberto Soto steals 13.5 million dollars from the national budget with the help of a teleprinter machine
1983		General Prosecutor Carlos Jimenez declares that MAS group have underground relations of support with the National Army
1983		Guerrilla leader Manuel Marulanda announces to the press that the FARC guerrilla has grown to 28 main divisions, causing international concern
1983		1983 Guerrilla leader Jaime Bateman Cayon a.k.a. "El Flaco" dies in a plane crash near the Gulf of Urabá while traveling from Santa Marta to Panama
1983		Jumbo 747 airplane of Avianca airlines, in flight from Bogotá, crashes in Mejorana del campo, near Barajas airport in Madrid, Spain. 189 passengers die, including Art critic Marta Traba
1983	31 March	Popayán is partially destroyed by an earthquake during the traditional celebrations of Holy Week
1984		Minister of Justice Rodrigo Lara Bonilla is shot to death by teenager hitmen hired by the Medellín Cartel. One of the hitmen, Byron de Jesus Velasquez, is captured
1984		President Betancur achieves a ceasefire with 80% of guerrilla forces in the country. In the case of FARC, this would be linked to the creation of the political movement Patriotic Union (Colombia) UP during the next year.
1984		Dissident guerrilla 19th of April Movement (M-19) attacks Florencia, Caquetá. Over 100 civilians dead
1984	10 March	Tranquilandia, a large cocaine processing laboratory located in the jungles of Caquetá, constructed for the Medellín Cartel is destroyed by units of the Colombian National Police, assisted by the DEA
1985		The Gorgona Island prison is dissolved and the island is declared National park
1985	10 January	Elkin Lucena performed the first successful In vitro fertilization, that allowed the birth of the first Latin American test tube baby (Carolina Mendez).
1985	23 May	Guerrilla leader Antonio Navarro is victim of a bomb that nearly killed him, and loses one leg
1985	July	Colombian cyclist Luis Herrera wins the Vuelta a España, first South American to win a Grand Tour
1985	16 September	Ceroxylon quindiuense is declared as the National tree by the national government
1985	6 November	M19 guerrilla attacks the supreme court in the Palace of Justice siege. The president of the Supreme Court of Colombia and many magistrates, employees and bystanders get killed. Over 100 fatal victims and undetermined number of missing persons. The army is accused of forced disappearance of civilians
1985	13 November	In the worst natural disaster in the history of Colombia, Armero city in Tolima department is destroyed due to a flood created by the eruption of Nevado del Ruiz volcano (Armero tragedy). Over 20.000 dead. Countless homes destroyed.
1985	14 December	Cardiologist Alberto Villegas performed the first heart transplant in Latin America to Antonio Yepes.
1986		Virgilio Barco is elected president of Colombia
1986		El Espectador newspaper director, Guillermo Cano is shot to death by hitmen
1986		Guerrilla leader Javier Delgado kills 150 fellow guerrilleros of the Ricardo Franco Group, in the Tacueyó massacre, because he suspected them to be infiltrated
1986	3 July	Pope John Paul II visits Bogotá and the remains of Armero tragedy
1986	9 August	Miguel "Happy" Lora wins the world boxing championship in the bantamweight division
1986	4 December	Campo Elías Delgado kills 29 persons (including his mother) and leaves 12 injured, in the Pozzetto restaurant massacre, presumably due to mental illness. The events are depicted in the 2006 movie Satanás.
1987		Guerrilla groups attack a military convoy in Caqueta breaking the 1984 truce. 42 soldiers dead and 27 injured
1987		Colombian Navy ship ARC Caldas sails in waters of Atlantic Ocean in dispute with Venezuela creating a serious diplomatic incident
1987	4 February	Drug dealer Carlos Lehder is captured in a farm near Medellín at 6:20 a.m. The same day at 5:20 p.m he is extradited and sent in a DEA turbocommander airplane to USA
1987	11 October	UP leaders Jaime Pardo Leal and Hector Abad are killed in La Mesa, Cundinamarca. Eventually this movement would be lose more than 3000 of their members due to violence
1988		Paramilitary groups commit massacres in Saiza, Mejor Esquina and Segovia, Antioquia
1988		General Prosecutor Carlos Mauro Hoyos is killed by hitmen
1988		The first election of city majors for popular vote
1988		Politicians Álvaro Gómez Hurtado and Andrés Pastrana are kidnapped by narcotrafficking related groups
1988		collapse of Stock market due to incarceration of financial managers Juan Ricardo Escobar and Guillermo Uribe Holguin
1988		Massacre of Trujillo, 107 victims. On 19 December 2006 Henry Loaiza-Ceballos was accused by Colombian authorities of being responsible for the massacre
1988		First Iberoamerican Theater Festival in Bogotá. 100.000 people attend to the closing act in Plaza de Bolívar
1988	21 March	Colombian Painter Dario Morales dies in Paris
1988	June	Serial killer Daniel Barbosa a.k.a. the Beast of the Andes confessed 72 murders
1988	18 August	Luis Carlos Galán, Politician and candidate to presidency is killed by hitmen in Soacha during a public speech
1989		Drug dealer Gonzalo Rodríguez Gacha is killed in a military operation
1989		First reports of the presence of Coffee borer beetle in Colombian coffee crops
1989	27 November	Avianca Flight 203 airplane HK1803 explodes in the air with 107 people on board, few minutes after leaving El Dorado International Airport as a result of a bomb planted by the Medellín Cartel. No survivors
1989	6 December	7:30 a.m. The Security Administration Department building (Departamento Administrativo de Seguridad DAS) and an important part of the commercial area of Paloquemao district in Bogotá are destroyed by a bomb, in what is considered the worst terrorist attack in Colombian history
1990		M19 Guerrilla leader Carlos Pizarro Leongómez is killed by hitmen when he was a presidential candidate
1990		César Gaviria is elected President of Colombia
1990		El Tiempo newspaper director Francisco Santos is kidnapped
1990		20 Emberá indigenous people are killed in the Caloto, Cauca massacre due to land ownership disagreements with local landlords
1990	22 March	UP leader politician Bernardo Jaramillo Ossa is killed by hitmen
1991		Rafael Pardo is the first civilian to be designated as minister of defense
1991		Minister of economy Rudolph Hommes announced the new aperture politic for international trade inspirited in the Russian perestroika and the creation of the National bank for international trade Bancomex
1991		Starts the first concessions for mobile telephony
1991	January	Journalist Diana Turbay is killed while kept kidnapped in a farm near Sabaneta
1991	January	Drug dealers Fabio, Juan David and Jorge Luis Ochoa Vázquez (The Ochoa brothers) and Pablo Escobar surrender themselves to the authorities
1991	17 February	Opening of the national assembly for reform to the 1886 national constitution (Constituent Assembly of Colombia)
1992		The Office of the Attorney General of Colombia is created, with Gustavo de Greiff designated as the first Attorney General
1992		Noemí Sanín is the new minister of foreign affairs. She is the first woman to be designed as a minister in Colombia
1992		The collapse of the national electricity generation system causes massive power blackouts all over the country with an average of 18 hours/day without electricity from March 1992 to April 1993
1992		Fernando Botero presents a collection of 31 sculptures in an outdoors exhibition in the Champs-Élysées in Paris
1992	20 July	Pablo Escobar escapes from the Cathedral Prison
1992	15 November	Villatina Massacre
1993		Massive celebration of the winning of Colombian soccer team in a play against Argentine team in Buenos Aires with final score 5–0. Riots all over the country.
1993		The national government achieves commercial treaties with Venezuela, Mexico and Ecuador
1993	14 January	Galeras volcano eruption killed nine people, including six scientists who had descended into the volcano's crater to sample gases.
1993	November	Bomb explodes on 15th Avenue of Bogotá, near the intersection with 93rd Street (in front of Centro 93 mall). 10 people die, over 100 injured
1993	2 December	Pablo Escobar dies in combats with the police
1994		Ernesto Samper is elected president of Colombia
1994		8000 Process scandal of Cali Cartel narcotrafficking money investment in the Samper electoral campaign starts with the public broadcasting of tapes from telephonic conversations among Minister Alberto Giraldo and drug dealers Gilberto and Miguel Rodríguez Orejuela
1994		Former president César Gaviria is designated as OEA general secretary
1994		A team of 10 people steals 24.075.000.000 pesos from the Republic Bank in Valledupar in the biggest bank robbery in the Colombian history
1994		Paez river flood in Cauca department kills hundreds of people and destroys villages in a length of 40 km
1994	11 February	CONVIVIR (Spanish for to coexist) program of cooperative neighbourhood watch groups is created by a decree of Colombia's Ministry of Defense
1994	20 May	Manuel Elkin Patarroyo received the Prince of Asturias Awards by his technical and scientific research in the development of synthetic malaria vaccine
1994	2 July	Due to the poor performance of the national soccer team in the USA soccer World Cup, an angry soccer aficionado shot to death soccer player Andrés Escobar
1995		76-year-old conservative politician Álvaro Gómez Hurtado is murdered by hitmen
1995	January	Plane crash in Marialabaja, Bolívar Department. 52 dead, only survivor 9-year-old girl Erika Delgado
1995	February	Luciano Pavarotti gives a concert in Bogotá
1995	9 June	Drug dealers Miguel and Gilberto Rodriguez Orejuela (The Rodriguez Brothers) are captured in a police operation
1995	30 November	Start operations of rapid transit rail system Metro de Medellín
1995	20 December	Plane crash near Cali airport. American Airlines plane with 163 occupants. 4 survivors
1996		Antioquia governor Álvaro Uribe orders the capture of the German citizens Werner and Michela Mauss, suspected of being FARC collaborators
1996		March of protest of 90.000 cocaleros (coca leaf illegal farmers) from Guaviare Department and Putumayo Department ended with 12 cocaleros dead. Army soldiers accused of brutality
1996		Guerrilla attack to the military base "Las Delicias" in Putumayo. 29 soldiers dead, 20 injured, 60 kidnapped
1996	26 June	La Gabarra Massacre
1996	24 July	Hurricane Cesar moves westward across the southern Caribbean and crosses over extreme northern Colombia and the San Andres archipelago. Cesar kills 11 people in Colombia due to flooding and mudslides.
1996	November	Aterciopelados band ranks number 1 in the MTV network, becoming the most successful Colombian rock band
1997		"Miti-Miti" corruption scandal, involving Minister of communications Saulo Arboleda and minister of mining and energy Rodrigo Villamizar accused of obtaining illegal profit of 100 fm radio concessions
1997	April	Salvatore Mancuso and Carlos Castaño conformed what they called the "Autodefensas Unidas de Colombia" (AUC) United Self-Defense Forces of Colombia
1997	15 April	Drug dealer Phanor Arizabaleta-Arzayus, member of the Cali Cartel is captured at a road checkpoint
1997	15 July	Mapiripán Massacre
1997	September	Carlos Castaño in a press interview admits responsibility for the Mapiripán Massacre. AUC is listed by the US Department of State as a Foreign Terrorist Organization.
1997	October	Bird (sculpture by Fernando Botero) was destroyed by a terrorist attack in downtown Medellín. About 17 people died. Several body parts remained unidentified. The remains of the sculpture are displayed in San Antonio Square as a memorial for the victims
1998		Andrés Pastrana is elected as president of Colombia
1998		Gloria Zea, director of the national Modern Art Museum organizes one of the largest art exhibits in Colombia "Arte y Violencia en Colombia" as a commemoration of 50th anniversary of the start of the bipartisan violence La Violencia
1998		Fernando Botero donates 100 of his works and 60 pieces of his private art collection (19th and 20th centuries) to the Antioquia Museum
1998	20 June	Plan Colombia (Treaty signed with USA for support in the war on drugs) is officially unveiled by President Pastrana
1998	7 November	President Pastrana granted to the FARC guerrilla a 42,000 km2 (16,200 sq mi) safe haven meant to serve as a confidence building measure, centered around the San Vicente del Caguán settlement
1999		Betty la fea soap opera a.k.a. Ugly Betty reach the highest levels of rating and the script is sold to different producers in several countries
1999	19 January	The 1999 Armenia earthquake devastates Armenia, Colombia. Over 2000 dead, 3000 missing persons and a quarter million people homeless
1999	14 April	ELN guerrilla kidnap Fokker airplane with 41 occupants in Bolívar department
1999	22 April	Serial killer Luis Garavito is found guilty of the murder of 138 boys. (The total number of victims according with Garavito confessions off-record is estimated up to 300 boys and an undetermined number of adults)
1999	30 May	Mass kidnapping of 70 people in La Maria church in Cali
1999	13 August	Comedian Jaime Garzón is murdered by hitmen
1999	13 November	Strong waves from Hurricane Lenny affect the Guajira Peninsula of Colombia, flooding 1,200 homes and businesses along the northern coastline. In addition, winds and rains from the hurricane causes severe crop damage in the country. The hurricane kills two in Colombia. (to 16 November)
1999	29 November	Date of death of Colombian essayist and historian Germán Arciniegas
2000		First Olympic gold medal in Colombian history, earned by María Isabel Urrutia in weightlifting
2000	30 March	A car bomb parked in front of the mayor's office in Cachipay (Cundinamarca Department) detonated, causing injuries to nineteen and deaths to four
2000	11 April	ELN bombs damage 4 meetinghouses of the Church of Jesus Christ of Latter-day Saints (LDS Church); bridge attack kills 1, injures 20.
2000	15 May	A woman was killed by a time bomb fastened to her neck by FARC guerrilla; 1 bomb disposal specialist died trying to deactivate the bomb and other 3 were wounded. The 2007 movie PVC-1 is based in this incident
2000	June	The sport of Precolumbian origin; Turmequé or tejo is declared as the National sport by the Colombian congress
2000	30 August	USA president Bill Clinton and his daughter Chelsea visit Cartagena de Indias
2000	4 September	A 70 kilograms of R1 explosive bomb exploded in Barrancabermeja's commercial district, injuring four policemen, two security guards and two civilians. The intended target was apparently the National Customs and Tax Directorate (DIAN).
2000	October	Macayepo massacre in Montes de María
2000	15 October	A bomb went off in Cali outside a rehabilitation center in the Obrero neighborhood. Two children were killed and thirty other injured. An explosive device went off in a Christian church in Cali, killing two and injuring fifteen.
2000	14 November	A guerrilla group gave a homeless man a package that, unbeknownst to him, was filled with explosives. The package exploded as he walked through the banking sector of Cali, killing him and wounding four others. The package reportedly contained 500 grams of ammonium nitrate fuel oil.
2000	4 December	Politician Fernando Araújo Perdomo is kidnapped by the Farc guerrilla
2000	18 December	Opening of the mass transportation system Transmilenio in Bogotá

== 21st century ==
Year	Date	Event
2001		The stock markets of Cali, Medellín and Bogotá are fused into a single entity: Bolsa de Valores de Colombia
2001		Singer Shakira Mebarak wins a Grammy Award for her MTV unplugged
2001	24 April	the House of Representatives Committee on International Relations published the findings of its investigation into IRA activities in Colombia
2001	4 May	A car bomb kills four and injures 32 in a luxury hotel in Cali. No group claims the attack.
2001	17 May	A car bomb kills 20 and injures at least 50 in a park in Medellín.
2001	11 July	Soccer tournament Copa America 2001 was held in Colombia (to 29 July)
2001	11 August	Arrest of the Irish Colombia Three charged with training FARC rebels in bomb-making
2001	23 August	In a series of attacks near Medellín, 10 bombs kill one and injure 39 others. At least 15 members of terrorist group ELN die when the explosives they were carrying detonate.
2001	29 September	Politician Consuelo Araújo is murdered while being kidnapped by FARC guerrilla
2002	25 January	A bomb kills a child and four police officers and injures 28 people in Bogotá. Rebel group FARC is blamed
2002	30 January	A car bomb kills five and injures 40 in the city of Florencia in the department of Caquetá
2002	21 February	President Pastrana ended the peace talks and ordered the armed forces to start retaking the FARC-EP controlled zone of San Vicente del Caguan
2002	24 February	Oxygen Green Party Politician Ingrid Betancourt is kiddnapped by FARC guerrilla
2002	March	President Uribe decided to appoint Marta Lucía Ramírez as Minister of Defense becoming the second woman in Latin America to ever hold this title, after Michelle Bachelet
2002	7 April	Two bombs explode in the restaurant district of Villavicencio, killing twelve and injuring 70. FARC is the prime suspect for the attack.
2002	11 April	Two police officers and a girl are killed by a bomb concealed in the corpse of a peasant (Pedro Nel Camacho) apparently executed by the FARC guerrilla with such purpose
2002	12 April	12 politicians in Valle del Cauca are kidnapped using a hoax antibomb operative, starting the Valle del Cauca Deputies hostage crisis
2002	12 April	A rocket explodes near the studios of RCN TV in Bogotá.
2002	14 April	During an assassination attempt of then-presidential candidate Álvaro Uribe Vélez a bomb kills two and injures 20 in Barranquilla. Rebel group FARC is blamed.
2002	2 May	Bojaya massacre in Chocó Department. A bomb destroys the local church. 117 dead, 114 injured.
2002	26 May	Cali bishop Isaias Duarte is murdered by hitmen
2002	7 August	Álvaro Uribe is elected president of Colombia
2002	7 August	Four rounds of mortars are fired against the Presidential Palace in Bogotá during the inauguration ceremony of President Álvaro Uribe Vélez. 13 people, mostly homeless, die and 50 are wounded. FARC is blamed.
2002	24 November	Guerrilla leader alias Simon Trinidad is extradited to USA
2002	13 December	A bomb destroys 30th floor of the Intercontinental Hotel in downtown Bogotá. 37 people injured.
2003	16 January	A car bomb kills four and injures 27 at a shopping mall in Medellín. The attack is believed to be a retaliation of FARC for the arrest of 53 of its members in the preceding days
2003	7 February	2003 El Nogal Club bombing. Car bomb kills 36 and injures more than 200 at the El Nogal social club in Bogotá; FARC rebels are blamed
2003	14 February	A bomb kills 18 and wounds 37 in Neiva, destroying 70 homes. Amongst the dead are the chief prosecutor in Neiva and the chief of police. FARC is blamed for the attack.
2003	5 March	A car bomb kills six and injures 68 in a covered parking lot in Cúcuta. Rebel group ELN is blamed for the attack.
2003	May	A group of Colombian Army soldiers, part of a Counter-terrorism unit, while cleaning up after an ambush by guerillas makes the surprising discovery of several tubs buried in the jungle which hold US$16.75 million in cash. They decide to keep the money for themselves, leading to their capture and trial. These events are depicted in the 2006 movie A Ton of Luck
2003	8 May	A bomb kills three in an attack against a water treatment plant in Cali.
2003	24 August	Six die and 28 are wounded when a bomb explodes in a riverboat in the town of Puerto Rico. Rebel group FARC is blamed.
2003	11 September	A bomb strapped to a horse kills eight and injures 15 in the village of Chita, Boyacá. The attack is blamed on FARC, as the same technique had been used in the past.
2003	29 September	A motorcycle packed with explosives kills ten and injures 54 in downtown Florencia, Caquetá. Rebel group FARC is blamed.
2003	8 October	A car bomb kills six and injures eleven in downtown Bogotá.
2003	15 November	A grenade attack from a motorcycle kills two and injures seventy in the Bogotá Beer Company, a popular pub in Bogotá. Two FARC members were captured.
2003	December	Biologist Raul Cuero wins NASA Technology Award for his research in removal of radionuclides such as uranium, using Martian simulated soil
2004	15 March	Date of death of popular salsa dancer Amparo Arrebato
2004	1 May	Ecuadorian government placed further stringent visa restrictions on Colombians seeking to enter Ecuador
2004	22 May	A bomb exploded in a crowded tavern/discothèque at 11:00 pm Saturday night killing six (some reports indicate seven) and wounding eighty-two. The bomb was packed in a small suitcase and left in the bathroom by suspected Revolutionary Armed Forces of Colombia (FARC) rebels. It is believed the bombing was part of a FARC campaign marking the organizations 40th anniversary.
2004	4 August	A bomb exploded at a bridge in Medellín moments before a parade of antique cars was scheduled to cross it, as the closing event at the annual Festival of the Flowers. 35 people injured.
2004	29 October	A bomb exploded near a bus stop along Bogotá's Transmilenio bus system route. A taxi passing by was caught in the blast resulting in the death of the driver and a passenger. 30 surrounded houses destroyed
2004	22 November	USA president George W. Bush visits Cartagena de Indias
2004	28 November	A bomb exploded beside the mayor's office in the Rafael Uribe district of Bogotá
2004	30 November	Three people were killed and eight wounded when a fragment grenade was left at a supermarket checkout counter
2004	13 December	Rodrigo Granda affair. FARC guerrilla leader Rodrigo Granda, was captured by individual Venezuelan officials in Caracas, Venezuela, and transferred to Cúcuta, Colombia (a departmental capital on the two nations' common border), where he was arrested by the Colombian authorities on 14 December, generating a diplomatic crisis with Venezuelan government.
2004	30 December	Radio Televisión Nacional de Colombia (RTVC) replaced the liquidated Instituto Nacional de Radio y Televisión (Inravisión) as the government-run radio and television broadcasting service
2005	January	Colombian justice adopts the adversarial system
2005	1 February	FARC attacks the Iscuande marine base in Narino Department with homemade rockets, killing 15 soldiers and injuring 25.
2005	3 February	A bridge was blown up in Putumayo Department, killing eight soldiers and a civilian.
2005	6 April	An ambush in Arauca state, near Venezuela, kills 17 soldiers.
2005	24 June	FARC attacks military positions in the location of Puerto Asís in the Putumayo department, killing 25 and wounding 20 in a single operation.
2005	27 October	The islands of San Andrés and Providencia are evacuated due to Hurricane Beta (2005). Hours later, a hurricane watch was issued.
2005	27 December	FARC launches a massive attack in the remote village of San Marino in the Chocó Department, killing at least six police officers along with the temporary abduction of some thirty, before they were released by the guerrillas on 20 December due to military pressure.
2005	28 December	FARC rebels ambush troops near Vista Hermosa, Meta, killing 28.
2006	28 May	Álvaro Uribe is re-elected for a second presidential term
2006	31 July	16 soldiers die in an ambush in Tibú and a car bomb kills one and injures 22 in Bogotá. Both attacks are blamed on FARC.
2006	4 August	A car bomb kills five outside a police station in Cali. FARC suspected responsible.
2006	19 October	A car bomb explodes in a military college in northern Bogotá.
2006	9 November	The Supreme Court ordered the detention of three congressmen implicated in the signature of an illegal agreement with the United Self-Defense Forces of Colombia at Santa Fe de Ralito starting the Colombian parapolitics scandal
2006	December	First Narco submarines of Colombian origin seized by the U.S. Coast Guard, authorities dubbed it Bigfoot because they had heard rumors that such things existed, but nobody had actually seen one.
2006	10 December	Paramilitary leader Salvatore Mancuso surrenders to the Colombian authorities
2007	5 January	kidnapped politician Fernando Araújo Perdomo escaped from his captors after a Colombian National Army military operation in the Montes de María mountains. Araújo spent several days in hiding without food or water until eventually finding help.
2007	1 March	Ten injured in a car bomb blast in Neiva, capital of Huila; rebel group FARC is believed responsible. The action is suspected to be an assassination attempt on Neiva's mayor.
2007	3 March	A bomb kills four police officers and one civilian in the city of Neiva, as they attempt to deactivate it
2007	16 March	A bomb kills 16 and injures 16 in Buenaventura. Authorities blame FARC.
2007	7 April	The first Colombian satellite, Libertad I is launched in orbit from Baikonur cosmodrome
2007	28 April	Kidnapped police officer Jhon Frank Pinchao escapes from the FARC guerrilla spending near a month lost in the jungle
2007	May	Virginia Vallejo, media personality and former lover of Pablo Escobar, published her memoir Amando a Pablo, odiando a Escobar (Loving Pablo, Hating Escobar), where she accused several Colombian presidents of involvement with drug traffickers
2007	28 June	Murder of the politicians kidnapped in the Valle del Cauca Deputies hostage crisis causes national outrage
2007	7 September	Colombian coffee achieves Protected designation of origin status granted by the European Union
2007	13 December	International Court of Justice of The Hague concluded the long-time dispute with the Republic of Nicaragua over the San Andrés y Providencia Islands in favor of Colombian sovereignty over the San Andres Archipelago, ratifying the Esguerra-Bárcenas treaty. signed between 1928 and 1930
2008	10 January	Former vice presidential candidate Clara Rojas and former congresswoman Consuelo González are freed after nearly six years in captivity
2008	1 March	The Colombian military attacks a FARC camp inside Ecuador's territory. Several guerrilla casualties including guerrilla leader Raul Reyes starting the 2008 Andean diplomatic crisis
2008	3 March	Iván Ríos, a member of the FARC Central High Command was killed by his security chief "Rojas".
2008	26 March	Guerrilla commander Manuel Marulanda Vélez dies
2008	18 May	Guerrilla leader Elda Neyis Mosquera alias "Karina" surrenders herself to the military forces
2008	2 July	Under a Colombian military operation called Operation Jaque, the FARC was tricked by the Colombian Government into releasing 15 hostages to Colombian Intelligence agents, including Ingrid Betancourt, U.S. military contractors, and Colombian soldiers and police officers
2008	15 August	Ituango, Antioquia. Seven people were killed and more than 50 wounded when a bomb detonated in a small town
2008	21 August	Colombia has chosen the European DVB-T standard for Digital terrestrial television
2008	30 October	Accusations of Colombian army soldiers involved with criminal bands with the purpose of luring unsuspecting unemployed or homeless people into isolated areas where they were murdered and the scenes were staged as combats against guerrilla in order to enhance their achievements and get performance-related payments, were investigated. The events, known as the 'false positives' scandal, led to the resignation of Commander-in-chief, general Mario Montoya. As of 2012, 3,350 such cases had been investigated in all parts of the country and verdicts had been reached in 170 cases.
2008	12 November	Riots broke out in the municipalities of Pasto, Tumaco, Popayán and later spread all over the country after the collapse of several pyramid schemes. Thousands of victims had invested their money in pyramids that promised them extraordinary interest rates. The lack of regulation laws allowed those pyramids to grow excessively during several years. Finally, after the riots the Colombian government was forced to declare the country in economical emergency in order to seize and stop those schemes. Several of the pyramid's managers were arrested and are being prosecuted for the crime of "illegal massive money reception".
2008	22 November	Colombia and Canada signed a new $1.14 billion dollar bilateral trade agreement (the Canada-Colombia Free Trade Agreement) at the Asia-Pacific Economic Cooperation meeting.
2009	8 January	Colombian drug lord and head of the Caqueta cartel Leonidas Vargas is murdered inside a hospital. his brother(Héctor Fabio Vargas) and his girlfriend (Colombian actress Liliana Andrea Lozano) were tortured and murdered in Pradera, Colombia.
2009	8 January	Recognition of same-sex unions in Colombia is achieved by rule of the Constitutional Court
2009	11 January	Reports of mass murders of Awá (kwaiker) indigenous people by FARC guerrilla
2009	February	Colombia has extended its existing tobacco control regulations by a smoking ban requiring all indoor work places and public places be immediately smoke-free, prohibiting tobacco advertising, promotions and sponsorship
2009	February	the fossils of 28 individual Titanoboa cerrejonensis, the largest snake ever discovered, were announced to have been found in the coal mines of Cerrejón in La Guajira, Colombia.
2009	March	The Álvarez incest case was uncovered when 59-year-old Arcedio Álvarez was arrested in Mariquita, Colombia, accused of sexually abusing his now 30-year-old daughter Alba Nidia Álvarez since the age of 9. The daughter also gave birth to 11 children, three of whom died.
2009	March	the Colombian government enacted a mandate to introduce E85 flexible-fuel vehicles
2009	15 March	Luis Carlos Sarmiento Angulo gets ranked in the Forbes list of world billionaires.
2009	April	The Colombian armed forces launched Strategic Leap, an offensive in borders areas where the FARC's forces has still a strong military presence, especially in Arauca, near the Venezuelan border.
2009	April	Colombian drug lord Daniel Rendón Herrera alias Don "Mario" is captured while hiding in a jungle.
2009	13 May	Vallenato composer and troubadour Rafael Escalona dies due to heart failure.
2009	14 May	During his visit to Colombia, the Czech Republic Prime Minister Mirek Topolánek negotiated a possible sale of Aero L-159 Alca combat aircraft with Colombian President Álvaro Uribe.
2009	June	Clara Guerrero wins Women's World Championship World Ranking Masters
2009	July 2009	The Colombian government claimed that AT4 anti-tank rockets manufactured by Saab Bofors Dynamics of Sweden, which were later purchased by Venezuela were being used by the FARC. In response, President Chavez ordered most staff members of the embassy in Colombia to return to Venezuela, including the ambassador. Only the "lowest functionaries" were left to staff the embassy.
2009	18 July	Ricardo Londoño, Colombia's first Formula One driver is murdered in the north Colombian Córdoba Department.
2009	8 August	Cuban artist Tania Bruguera sets a controversial performance in the National University of Colombia (Bogotá branch), included consumption of cocaine provided by the artist to the attendants.
2009	30 August	President Álvaro Uribe had contracted the AH1N1 flu virus, becoming the second head of state to do so (the first being Óscar Arias).
2009	11 September	A group of eradicators of Coca crops near the village of La Gabarra, Municipality of Tibú, Norte de Santander is attacked by guerrilla forces with a donkey with bombs attached to it. 2 people deceased

== See also ==
- Timeline of Bogotá
- Timeline of Cali
- Timeline of Cartagena, Colombia
- List of presidents of Colombia
- List of vice presidents of Colombia
