= 1753 =

1753 in various calendars
- Gregorian calendar: 1753; MDCCLIII
- Ab urbe condita: 2506
- Armenian calendar: 1202; ԹՎ ՌՄԲ
- Assyrian calendar: 6503
- Balinese saka calendar: 1674–1675
- Bengali calendar: 1159–1160
- Berber calendar: 2703
- British Regnal year: 26 Geo. 2 – 27 Geo. 2
- Buddhist calendar: 2297
- Burmese calendar: 1115
- Byzantine calendar: 7261–7262
- Chinese calendar: 壬申年 (Water Monkey); 4450 or 4243 — to — 癸酉年 (Water Rooster); 4451 or 4244
- Coptic calendar: 1469–1470
- Discordian calendar: 2919
- Ethiopian calendar: 1745–1746
- Hebrew calendar: 5513–5514
- Hindu calendars
- Vikram Samvat: 1809–1810
- Shaka Samvat: 1674–1675
- Kali Yuga: 4853–4854
- Holocene calendar: 11753
- Igbo calendar: 753–754
- Iranian calendar: 1131–1132
- Islamic calendar: 1166–1167
- Japanese calendar: Hōreki 3 (宝暦３年)
- Javanese calendar: 1678–1679
- Julian calendar: Gregorian minus 11 days
- Korean calendar: 4086
- Minguo calendar: 159 before ROC 民前159年
- Nanakshahi calendar: 285
- Thai solar calendar: 2295–2296
- Tibetan calendar: ཆུ་ཕོ་སྤྲེ་ལོ་ (male Water-Monkey); 1879 or 1498 or 726 — to — ཆུ་མོ་བྱ་ལོ་ (female Water-Bird); 1880 or 1499 or 727

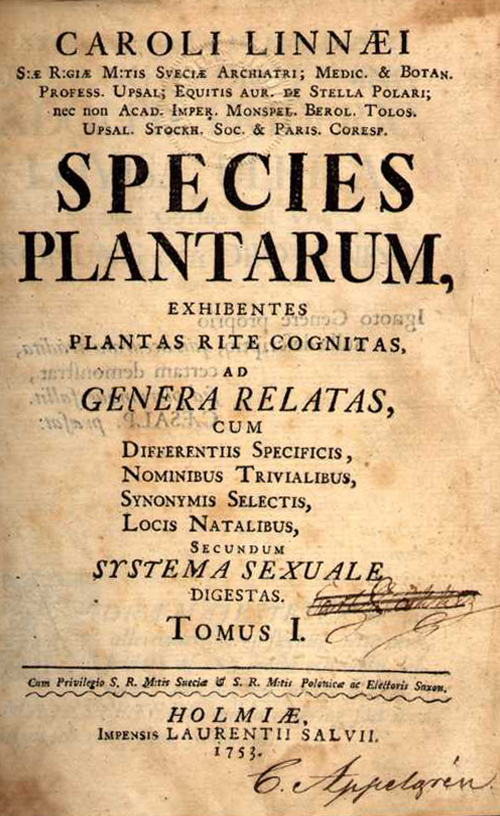
May 1: Biological classification of species is introduced with the publication of Species Plantarum by Linnaeus

1753 (MDCCLIII) was a common year starting on Monday of the Gregorian calendar and a common year starting on Friday of the Julian calendar, the 1753rd year of the Common Era (CE) and Anno Domini (AD) designations, the 753rd year of the 2nd millennium, the 53rd year of the 18th century, and the 4th year of the 1750s decade. As of the start of 1753, the Gregorian calendar was 11 days ahead of the Julian calendar, which remained in localized use until 1923.

== Events ==
=== January–March ===
- January 3 – King Binnya Dala of the Hanthawaddy Kingdom orders the burning of Ava, the former capital of the Kingdom of Burma.
- January 29 – After a month's absence, Elizabeth Canning returns to her mother's home in London and claims that she was abducted; the following criminal trial causes an uproar.
- February 17 – The concept of electrical telegraphy is first published in the form of a letter to Scots' Magazine from a writer who identifies himself only as "C.M.". Titled "An Expeditious Method of Conveying Intelligence", C.M. suggests that static electricity (generated by 1753 from "frictional machines") could send electric signals across wires to a receiver. Rather than the dot and dash system later used by Samuel F.B. Morse, C.M. proposes that "a set of wires equal in number to the letters of the alphabet, be extended horizontally between two given places" and that on the receiving side, "Let a ball be suspended from every wire" and that a paper with a letter on it be underneath each wire.
- March 1 – Sweden adopts the Gregorian calendar, by skipping the 11 days difference between it and the Julian calendar, and letting February 17 be followed directly by March 1.

=== April–June ===
- April 16 – The Jewish Naturalisation Act 1753 is passed by Britain's House of Lords, permitting Jewish immigrants to England to become naturalized citizens "without receiving the Sacrament of the Lord's Supper". The bill, introduced by George Montagu-Dunk, 2nd Earl of Halifax, passes the House of Commons on May 22.
- May 1 – Species Plantarum is published by Linnaeus (adopted by the International Code of Botanical Nomenclature as the formal start date of the scientific classification of plants).
- May 22 – The Jewish Naturalisation Act 1753 passes the House of Commons and later receives royal assent from King George II.
- June 6 – The Parliament of Great Britain passes Lord Hardwicke's Marriage Act "for the Better Preventing of Clandestine Marriage" in England and Wales. King George II adjourns Parliament the next day; the act comes into effect on March 25, 1754.
- June 7 – The British Museum is established in London, by Act of Parliament.

=== July–September ===
- July 7 – The Parliament of Great Britain's Jewish Naturalization Act receives royal assent, allowing naturalization to Jews; it is repealed in 1754.

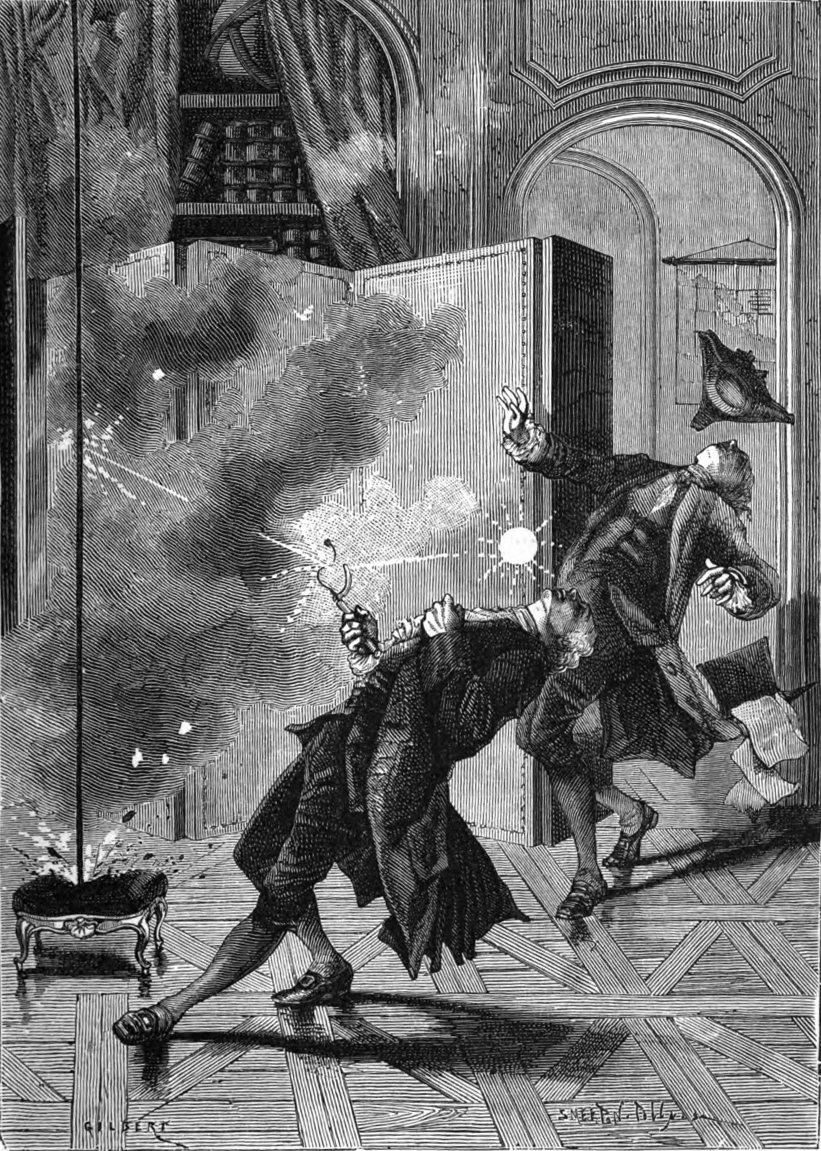
Richmann's electrocution

- August 6 – Russian scientist Georg Richmann becomes the first person to be electrocuted by his own equipment after he uses an insulated, but improperly grounded, lightning rod in an attempt to gather data on a thunderstorm. Richmann also becomes the first victim of ball lightning during his scientific experiment, in an attempt to replicate the experiments of American Benjamin Franklin.
- August 7 – The Unity of Brethren, a branch of the Moravian Church, receives a grant the Wachovia Tract, 99,985 acres (404.62 km^{2}) of land (approximately 157 square miles), in western North Carolina, for the benefit of German-speaking immigrants to America. The area now includes Winston-Salem, North Carolina.
- August 21 – After receiving a series of warnings about incursions into land claimed by the Crown Colony of Virginia (from the colony's Lieutenant Governor, Robert Dinwiddie), the cabinet of British Prime Minister Henry Pelham votes to send a warning to Britain's colonial governors "to prevent, by Force, These and any such attempts" to encroach on their lands "that may be made by the French, or by the Indians in the French interest." Britain's Secretary of State for the Southern Department, the Earl of Holderness, sends the circular order on August 28.
- September 3 – Tanacharison, a chief of the Oneida people tribe that is one of the "Six Nations" of the Iroquois Confederacy, meets with French officers who have come into the Ohio and Allegheny region and warns them not to advance further into the Iroquois territory.
- September 18 – Britain's Board of Trade sends a directive to the colonial and provincial governors of Maryland, Massachusetts, New Hampshire, New Jersey, New York, and Pennsylvania ordering them to send delegates to a summit meeting with the Iroquois Confederacy. The message instructs the governors that King George II has ordered "a Sum of Money to be issued for Presents to the Six Nations of Indians" and ordering New York's Governor George Clinton "to hold an Interview with them for delivering these Presents, for burying the Hatchet, and for renewing the Covenant Chain with them."

=== October–December ===
- October 31 – Virginia Lieutenant Governor Dinwiddie commissions 21-year-old militia Major George Washington to dissuade the French from occupying the Ohio Country.
- November 12 – Spain's King Fernando VI issues a set of 25 regulations and restrictions for theatrical performances, including a requirement that the directors of the acting troupes "take the greatest care that the necessary modesty is preserved" and that the actors should be reminded that chastity requires that "indecent and provocative" dances should be avoided.
- November 12 – A fire destroys the Emperor's Palace in Moscow.
- November 24 – José Alfonso Pizarro completes more than four years as the Spanish Viceroy of New Granada (which comprises modern-day Colombia, Venezuela and Ecuador) and is succeeded by José Solís Folch de Cardona.
- November 25 – The Russian Academy of Sciences announces a competition among chemists and physicists to provide "the best explanation of the true causes of electricity including their theory", with a deadline of June 1, 1755 (on the Julian calendar used in Russia, June 12 on the Gregorian calendar used in Western Europe and the New World).
- December 11 – Major George Washington and British guide Christopher Gist arrive at Fort Le Boeuf (near modern-day Waterford, Pennsylvania and the city of Erie), a French fortress built in territory claimed by the British Crown Colony of Virginia. Washington presents the fort's commander, French Army Captain Jacques Legardeur de Saint-Pierre, a message from Virginia's Lieutenant Governor Dinwiddie advising that "The lands upon the Ohio River are so notoriously known to be the property of the Crown of Great Britain that it is a matter of equal concern and surprise... to hear that a body of French fortresses and making settlements upon that river, within His Majesty's dominions," adding that "It becomes my duty to require your peaceable departure." Captain Legardeur provides a reply for Washington to take to Dinwiddie, declaring that the rights of France's King Louis XV to the land "are incontestable", and refuses to back down, leading to beginning of the French and Indian War in 1754.

=== Date unknown ===
- James Lind writes A Treatise of the Scurvy.
- Robert Wood publishes The ruins of Palmyra; otherwise Tedmor in the desart in English and French, making the ancient Syrian city of Palmyra known to the West.
- The Cramer family starts a brewing operation at Warstein in North Rhine-Westphalia, originating the Warsteiner brand.

== Births ==
- February 12 – François-Paul Brueys d'Aigalliers, French admiral (d. 1798)
- March 8 – William Roscoe, English writer (d. 1831)
- March 9 – Jean-Baptiste Kléber, French general (d. 1800)
- March 26 – Benjamin Thompson, American physicist and inventor (d. 1814)
- April 3 – Simon Willard, American horologist (d. 1848)
- April 28– Franz Karl Achard, German chemist, physicist and biologist (d. 1821)
- May 13 – Lazare Carnot, French general, politician and mathematician (d. 1823)
- June 5 – Johann Friedrich August Göttling, German chemist (d. 1809)
- July 9 – William Waldegrave, 1st Baron Radstock, British admiral, Governor of Newfoundland (d. 1825)
- c. August 11 – Thomas Bewick, English wood engraver (d. 1828)

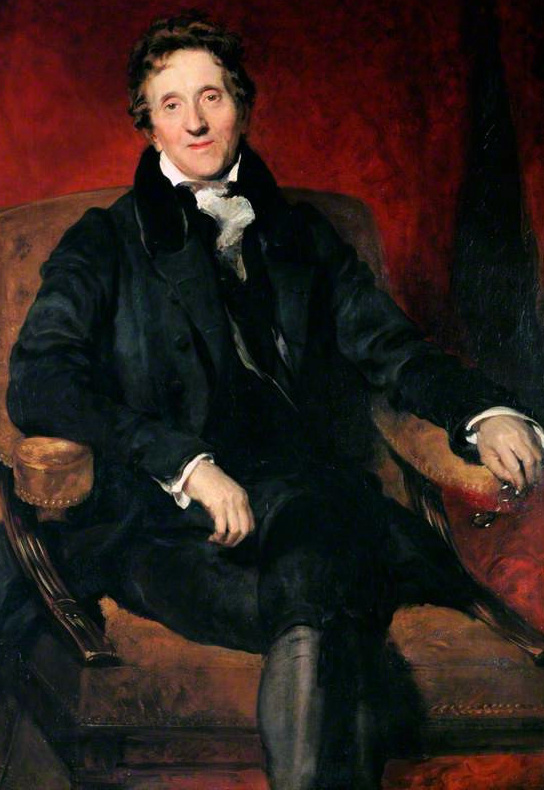
John Soane

- September 10 – John Soane, English architect (d. 1837)
- October 27 – Jean-Baptiste de Lavalette, French general (d. 1794)
- November 6 – Jean-Baptiste Breval, French composer (d. 1823)
- November 20 – Louis-Alexandre Berthier, French marshal (d. 1815)
- November 25 – Robert Townsend, member of the Culper Spy Ring (d. 1838)
- December 3 – Samuel Crompton, English inventor (d. 1827)
- date unknown
  - Francesc Antoni de la Dueña y Cisneros, Spanish bishop (d. 1821)
  - John Haggin, "Indian fighter", one of the earliest settlers of Kentucky (d. 1825)
  - Quang Trung, Vietnamese emperor (d. 1792)
  - Phillis Wheatley, African-born American poet (d. 1784)

== Deaths ==
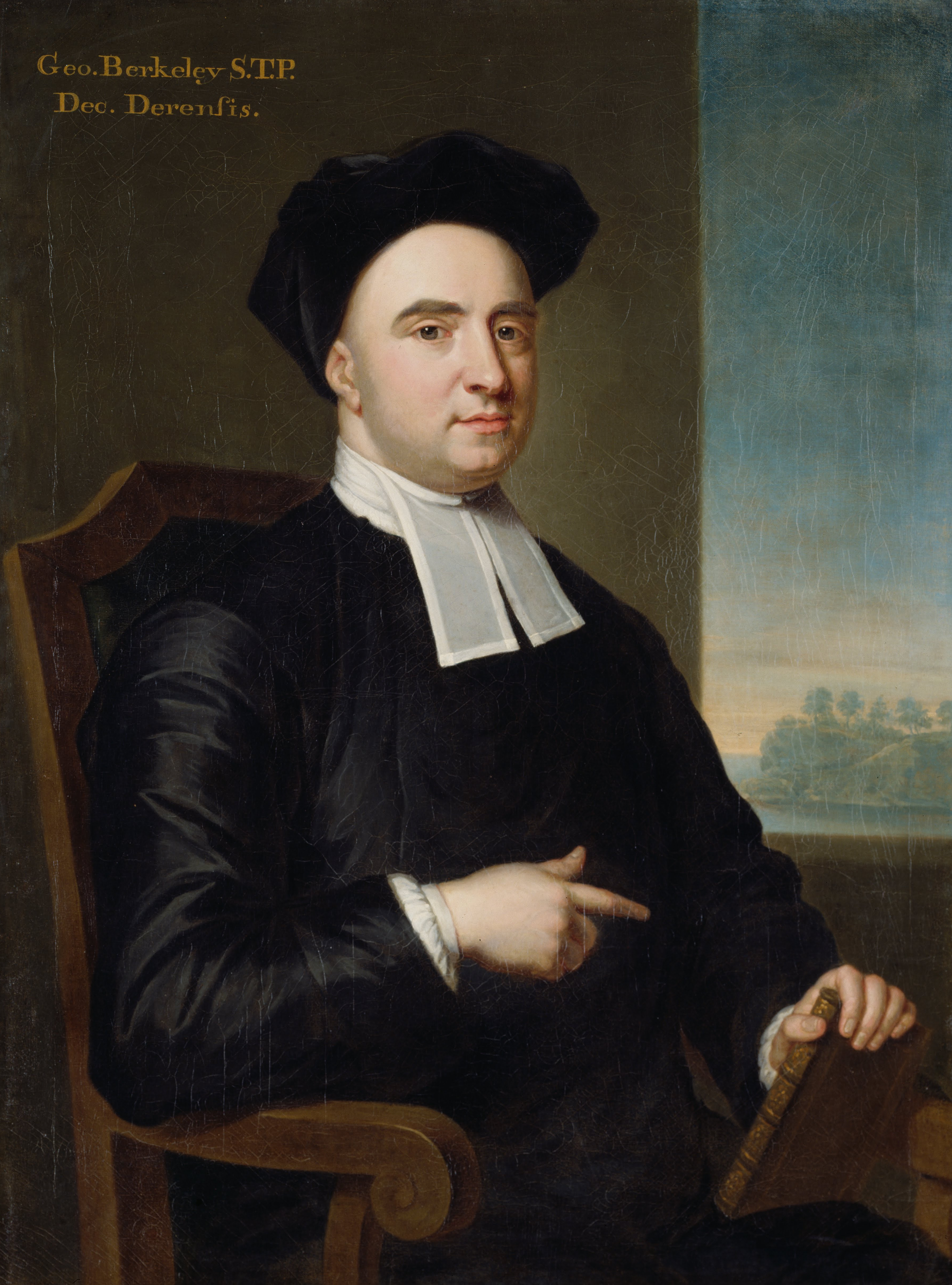
George Berkeley

- January 11 – Sir Hans Sloane, Irish-born physician and collector (b. 1660)
- January 14 – George Berkeley, Irish-born philosopher and bishop (b. 1685)
- January 23 – Louise Bénédicte de Bourbon, French royal princess, saloniste (b. 1676)
- February 16 – Giacomo Facco, Italian composer (b. 1676)
- February 22 – Eleonore of Löwenstein-Wertheim, German countess (b. 1686)
- May 23 – Franciszka Urszula Radziwiłłowa, Polish dramatist (b. 1705)
- June 7 – Archibald Cameron of Locheil, last Scottish Jacobite to be executed for treason (b. 1707)
- June 10 – Joachim Ludwig Schultheiss von Unfriedt, German architect (b. 1678)
- August 5 – Charlotta Elisabeth van der Lith, politically active Governor's wife in Surinam (b. 1700)
- August 6 – Georg Wilhelm Richmann, Russian physicist (struck by lightning) (b. 1711)
- August 19 – Balthasar Neumann, German architect and military engineer (b. 1687)
- September 20 – Johann Georg Weishaupt, German lawyer (b. 1716)
- October 12 – Sir Danvers Osborn, 3rd Baronet, British politician and governor of the Province of New York (b. 1715)
- October 26 – Margareta von Ascheberg, Swedish land owner, countess and acting regimental colonel (b. 1671)
- November 9 – Charles August, Prince of Nassau-Weilburg, Prince of Nassau-Weilburg (1719–1753) (b. 1685)
- November 10 – Bertrand-François Mahé de La Bourdonnais, French naval officer and governor of Isle de France (Mauritius) (b. 1699)
- November 22 – Samuel-Jacques Bernard, French nobility (b. 1686)
- December 4 – Richard Boyle, 3rd Earl of Burlington, English architect (b. 1694)
- December 25 – Godolphin Arabian, Yemeni-foaled English thoroughbred stallion (b. c. 1724)

== SQL ==
Microsoft SQL Server (and Sybase) has a minimum date value of 1/1/1753.
