= New Kingdom of Granada =

Colombia in the Spanish Empire

New Kingdom of Granada Nuevo Reino de Granada Nuevo Reyno de Granada
- 1550 (Note: The Muisca conquest and the Spanish conquest of New Granada was finalized by 1540)–1821
- Arms of Santa Fe de Bogotá

- The New Kingdom of Granada
- Status: Realm of Castile (1550‍–‍1715) Realm of Spain (1715‍–‍1821)
- Capital: Santa Fe de Bogotá
- Official languages: Spanish
- Indigenous languages: Chibchan languages; Arawakan languages; Cariban languages; Chocoan languages; Barbacoan languages
- Religion: Catholicism
- Government: Colonial Province (1538–1550); Colonial Kingdom (1550–1717); Colonial Viceroyalty (1717–1723); Colonial Kingdom (1723–1739); Colonial Viceroyalty (1739–1810)
- King
- Viceroy
- Legislature: Council of the Indies
- Historical era: Spanish colonization of the Americas
  - Established: October 12, 1550 (Note: The Muisca conquest and the Spanish conquest of New Granada was finalized by 1540)
  - Viceroyalty established: May 27, 1717
  - Viceroyalty suppressed; kingdom autonomous again: November 5, 1723
  - Disestablished: September 27, 1821

Population
  - 1650: 750,000 (Inc. Popayán Province)
- Currency: Real
Preceded by
Muisca Confederation
Pijao people
Tairona
Paez people
Quimbaya
Province of Tierra Firme
Providence Island colony
Succeeded by
Viceroyalty of New Granada
- Today part of: Colombia; Panama

The New Kingdom of Granada (Spanish: Nuevo Reino de Granada), or Kingdom of New Granada, was the name given to a group of colonial-era Spanish ultramarine provinces in northern South America governed by the president of the Real Audiencia of Santa Fe, an area corresponding mainly to modern-day Colombia. The conquistadors originally organized it as a province with a Real Audiencia within the Viceroyalty of Peru and thus having a certain level of independence from it. The audiencia was established by the crown in 1549.

Later, the kingdom became the core region of the Viceroyalty of New Granada, first established in 1717, and permanently established in 1739. Before that, New Granada was part of the Viceroyalty of Peru. After its separation from the Viceroyaly of Peru, New Granada became one of the constituent kingdoms within the newly created Viceroyalty of New Granada, which also included at various moments the similarly ranked kingdoms of Quito, Tierra Firme and Venezuela.

After several attempts to set up independent states in the 1810s, the kingdom and the viceroyalty ceased to exist altogether around 1819 with the establishment of the first Republic of Colombia.

== History ==
=== European colonization ===
In 1514, the Spanish first permanently settled in the area. With Santa Marta (founded on July 29, 1525, by the Spanish conquistador Rodrigo de Bastidas) and Cartagena (1533), Spanish control of the coast was established, and the extension of colonial control into the interior could begin. Starting in 1536, the conquistador Gonzalo Jiménez de Quesada explored the extensive highlands of the interior of the region by following the Magdalena River into the Andean cordillera. There his force defeated the powerful Muisca and founded the city of Santa Fe de Bogotá, naming the region El nuevo reino de Granada, "the new kingdom of Granada", in honor of the last part of Spain to be recaptured from the Moors, home to the brothers de Quesada. After Gonzalo Jiménez de Quesada left for Spain in May 1539, the reign of the colony was transferred to his brother Hernán. De Quesada, however, lost control of the province when Emperor Charles V granted the right to rule over the area to rival conquistador Sebastián de Belalcázar in 1540, who had entered the region from what is today Ecuador, and named himself governor of Popayán.

=== Regularization of the government ===
Charles V ordered the establishment of an audiencia, a type of superior court that combined executive and judicial authority, at Santa Fe de Bogotá in 1549.

== Demographics ==
In 1650, the population of the New Kingdom of Granada (including the Province of Popayán) was estimated to be around 750,000, with Indians numbering 600,000 people, or 80% of the population. This is far lower than the Pre-Columbian population in which the population was estimated at 6,000,000 people.

== Real Audiencia ==
The Real Audiencia was created by a royal decree of July 17, 1549. It was given authority over the provinces of Santa Marta, Río de San Juan, Popayán, Guayana and Cartagena de Indias. The Audiencia was charged primarily with dispensing justice, but it was also to oversee the running of government and the settlement of the territory. It held its first session on April 7, 1550, in a mansion on the Plaza Mayor (today, Plaza de Bolívar) at the site which today houses the Colombian Palace of Justice.

Law VIII ("Royal Audiencia and Chancery of Santa Fe in the New Kingdom of Granada") of Title XV ("Of the Royal Audiencias and Chanceries of the Indies") of Book II of the Recopilación de Leyes de las Indias of 1680—which compiles the decrees of July 17, 1549; May 10, 1554; and August 1, 1572—describes the final limits and functions of the Audiencia.

In Santa Fé de Bogotá of the New Kingdom of Granada shall reside another Royal Audiencia and Chancery of ours, with a president, governor and captain general; five judges of civil cases [oidores], who shall also be judges of criminal cases [alcaldes del crimen]; a crown attorney [fiscal]; a bailiff [alguacil mayor]; a lieutenant of the Gran Chancellor; and the other necessary ministers and officials, and which will have for district the provinces of the New Kingdom and those of Santa Marta, Río de San Juan, and of Popayán, except those places of the latter which are marked for the Royal Audiencia of Quito; and of Guayana, or El Dorado, it shall have that which is not of the Audienicia of Hispaniola, and all of the Province of Cartagena; sharing borders: on the south with said Audiencia of Quito and the undiscovered lands, on the west and north with the North Sea and the provinces which belong to the Royal Audiencia of Hispaniola, on the west with the one of Tierra Firme. And we order that the Governor and Captain General of said provinces and president of their Royal Audiencia, have, use and exercise by himself the government of all the district of that Audiencia, in the same manner as our Viceroys of New Spain and appoint the repartimiento of Indians and other offices that need to be appointed, and attend to all the matters and business that belong to the government, and that the oidores of said Audiencia do not interfere with this, and that all sign what in matters of justice is provided for, sentenced and carried out.

One further change came as part of the Bourbon Reforms of the eighteenth century. Because of the slowness in communications between Lima and Bogotá, the Bourbons decided to establish an independent Viceroyalty of New Granada in 1717 (which was re-established in 1739 after a short interruption). The governor-president of Bogotá became the viceroy of the new entity, with military and executive oversight over the neighboring Presidency of Quito and the provinces of Venezuela.

== Presidents of the Real Audiencia of Bogotá ==
(The president of the Royal Audiencia of Bogotá was also governor general of the New Kingdom of Granada.)

- Vacant between 1550 and 1564
- Andrés Díaz Venero de Leiva (1564–1574)
- Francisco Briceño (1574–1575)
- Lope Díez de Aux y Armendáriz (1578–1580)
- Francisco Guillén Chaparro
- Antonio González (1590–1597)
- Francisco de Sande (1597–1602)
- Juan Buenaventura de Borja y Armendia (1605–1628)
- Sancho Girón de Narváez (1630–1637)
- Martín de Saavedra Galindo de Guzmán (1637–1645)
- Juan Fernández de Córdoba y Coalla (1645–1652)
- Dionisio Pérez Manrique de Lara (1654–1659, 1660)
- Diego de Egües y Beaumont (1662–1664)
- Diego del Corro y Carrascal (1666–1667)
- Diego de Villalba y Toledo (1667–1671)
- Melchor Liñán y Cisneros (1671–1674)
- Francisco Castillo de la Concha y Bracamonte (1679–1685)
- Gil de Cabrera y Dávalos (1686–1691, 1694–1703)
- Diego Córdoba Lasso de la Vega (1703–1710, 1711–1712)
- Francisco de Otero y Cossío (1710–1711)
- Francisco Meneses Bravo de Saravia (1712–1715)
- Francisco del Rincón (1717–1718)
- Antonio de la Pedrosa y Guerrero (1718–1719)
- Jorge de Villalonga (1719–1723), also Viceroy of New Granada
- Antonio Manso Maldonado (1724–1731)
- Rafael de Eslava (1733–1737)
- Antonio González Manrique (1738)
- Francisco González Manrique (1739–1740)

== Provinces ==
The Kingdom of New Granada was made up of the various Spanish colonial provinces that were administered under the authority of the Real Audiencia of Santa Fe de Bogotá. Some of those provinces are listed in the following table:

Provinces subject to the Real Audiencia of Santa Fe in New Granada (1550–1821)
Name	Capital	Established	Part of New Granada		Notes
Name	Capital	Established	From	To	Notes
Antioquia	Antioquia	1569	1569	1810	Became part of New Granada after its foundation in 1569. It became autonomous in 1810 and was briefly reincorporated into New Granada between 1816 and 1819.
Antioquia	Antioquia	1569	1816	1819	Became part of New Granada after its foundation in 1569. It became autonomous in 1810 and was briefly reincorporated into New Granada between 1816 and 1819.
Borja	Borja	1619	1718	1721	Originally part of the Real Audiencia of Quito. It was briefly ruled from the Real Audiencia of Santa Fe during the brief suppression of the Real Audiencia of Quito.
Caguán	Caguán	1585	1585	1695	Established after the foundation of the city of Espíritu Santo del Caguán, somewhere along the Caguán River. The city was abandoned and the province abolished in 1695.
Caracas	Caracas	1527	1717	1725	Originally part of the Real Audiencia of Santo Domingo. It was briefly ruled from the Real Audiencia of Santa Fe and then returned to the jurisdiction of Santo Domingo.
Cartagena	Cartagena	1533	1550	1810	Came under the jurisdiction of New Granada in 1550. It became autonomous in 1810 and was briefly reincorporated into New Granada between 1816 and 1819.
Cartagena	Cartagena	1533	1816	1819	Came under the jurisdiction of New Granada in 1550. It became autonomous in 1810 and was briefly reincorporated into New Granada between 1816 and 1819.
Casanare	Pore	1588	1588	1810	Became part of New Granada after its foundation in 1588. It became autonomous in 1810 and was never reconquered during the Spanish Reconquest of New Granada.
Chocó	Quibdó	1726	1726	1810	Became part of New Granada after its foundation in 1726. It became autonomous in 1810 and was briefly reincorporated into New Granada between 1816 and 1819.
Chocó	Quibdó	1726	1816	1819	Became part of New Granada after its foundation in 1726. It became autonomous in 1810 and was briefly reincorporated into New Granada between 1816 and 1819.
Cumaná	Cumaná	1568	1717	1725	Originally part of the Real Audiencia of Santo Domingo. It was ruled twice from Santa Fe but it was ultimately transferred to the Real Audiencia of Caracas in 1776.
Cumaná	Cumaná	1568	1740	1776	Originally part of the Real Audiencia of Santo Domingo. It was ruled twice from Santa Fe but it was ultimately transferred to the Real Audiencia of Caracas in 1776.
Darién	Yaviza	1712	1751	1821	Originally part of the Real Audiencia of Panamá. It was transferred to the Real Audiencia of Santa Fe after the abolition of the Real Audiencia of Panamá in 1751.
Girón	Girón	1631	1631	1795	Became part of New Granada after its foundation in 1631. The Province of Pamplona succeeded that of Girón after the capital was moved from Girón to Pamplona.
Guayana	Angostura	1585	1717	1725	Originally part of the Real Audiencia of Santo Domingo. It was ruled twice from Santa Fe but it was ultimately transferred to the Real Audiencia of Caracas in 1776.
Guayana	Angostura	1585	1762	1776	Originally part of the Real Audiencia of Santo Domingo. It was ruled twice from Santa Fe but it was ultimately transferred to the Real Audiencia of Caracas in 1776.
Guayaquil	Guayaquil	1552	1718	1721	Originally part of the Real Audiencia of Quito. It was briefly ruled from the Real Audiencia of Santa Fe during the brief suppression of the Real Audiencia of Quito.
Jaén	Jaén	1582	1718	1721	Originally part of the Real Audiencia of Quito. It was briefly ruled from the Real Audiencia of Santa Fe during the brief suppression of the Real Audiencia of Quito.
Mariquita	Mariquita	1550	1550	1810	Became part of New Granada after its foundation in 1550. It became autonomous in 1810 and was briefly reincorporated into New Granada between 1816 and 1819.
Mariquita	Mariquita	1550	1816	1819	Became part of New Granada after its foundation in 1550. It became autonomous in 1810 and was briefly reincorporated into New Granada between 1816 and 1819.
Maracaibo	Maracaibo	1751	1751	1776	Originally part of the Real Audiencia of Santo Domingo. It was briefly ruled from Santa Fe but it was ultimately transferred to the Real Audiencia of Caracas in 1776.
Margarita	La Asunción	1525	1717	1725	Originally part of the Real Audiencia of Santo Domingo. It was briefly ruled from the Real Audiencia of Santa Fe and then returned to the jurisdiction of Santo Domingo.
Mérida	Mérida	1607	1717	1751	Became part of New Granada in 1717. The Province of Maracaibo succeeded that of Mérida after the capital was moved from Mérida to Maracaibo.
Muzo	Muzo	1575	1575	1649	Became part of New Granada after its foundation in 1575. The province was later abolished and reincorporated into the Province of Tunja in 1649.
Neiva	Neiva	1610	1610	1810	Became part of New Granada after its foundation in 1610. It became autonomous in 1810 and was briefly reincorporated into New Granada between 1816 and 1819.
Neiva	Neiva	1610	1816	1819	Became part of New Granada after its foundation in 1610. It became autonomous in 1810 and was briefly reincorporated into New Granada between 1816 and 1819.
Pamplona	Pamplona	1795	1795	1810	Became part of New Granada after its foundation in 1795. It became autonomous in 1810 and was briefly reincorporated into New Granada between 1816 and 1819.
Pamplona	Pamplona	1795	1816	1819	Became part of New Granada after its foundation in 1795. It became autonomous in 1810 and was briefly reincorporated into New Granada between 1816 and 1819.
Panamá	Panamá	1539	1751	1821	Originally part of the Real Audiencia of Panamá. It was transferred to the Real Audiencia of Santa Fe after the abolition of the Real Audiencia of Panamá in 1751.
Popayán	Popayán	1540	1718	1721	Originally part of the Real Audiencia of Quito. It was briefly ruled from the Real Audiencia of Santa Fe during the brief suppression of the Real Audiencia of Quito.
Quijos	Baeza	1554	1718	1721	Originally part of the Real Audiencia of Quito. It was briefly ruled from the Real Audiencia of Santa Fe during the brief suppression of the Real Audiencia of Quito.
Quito	Quito	1540	1718	1721	Originally part of the Real Audiencia of Quito. It was briefly ruled from the Real Audiencia of Santa Fe during the brief suppression of the Real Audiencia of Quito.
Santa Fe	Santa Fe	1538	1550	1810	Became part of New Granada after its foundation in 1550. It became autonomous in 1810 and was briefly reincorporated into New Granada between 1816 and 1819.
Santa Fe	Santa Fe	1538	1816	1819	Became part of New Granada after its foundation in 1550. It became autonomous in 1810 and was briefly reincorporated into New Granada between 1816 and 1819.
Santa Marta	Santa Marta	1533	1550	1821	Came under the jurisdiction of New Granada in 1550. It became autonomous in 1810 and was briefly reincorporated into New Granada between 1816 and 1819.
Socorro	Socorro	1795	1795	1810	Became part of New Granada after its foundation in 1795. It became autonomous in 1810 and was briefly reincorporated into New Granada between 1816 and 1819.
Socorro	Socorro	1795	1816	1819	Became part of New Granada after its foundation in 1795. It became autonomous in 1810 and was briefly reincorporated into New Granada between 1816 and 1819.
Trinidad	San José	1529	1717	1725	Originally part of the Real Audiencia of Santo Domingo. It was briefly ruled from the Real Audiencia of Santa Fe and then returned to the jurisdiction of Santo Domingo.
Tunja	Tunja	1539	1550	1810	Came under the jurisdiction of New Granada in 1550. It became autonomous in 1810 and was briefly reincorporated into New Granada between 1816 and 1819.
Tunja	Tunja	1539	1816	1819	Came under the jurisdiction of New Granada in 1550. It became autonomous in 1810 and was briefly reincorporated into New Granada between 1816 and 1819.
Veraguas	Veraguas	1508	1751	1821	Originally part of the Real Audiencia of Panamá. It was transferred to the Real Audiencia of Santa Fe after the abolition of the Real Audiencia of Panamá in 1751.
Yaguarzongo	Valladolid	1556	1718	1721	Originally part of the Real Audiencia of Quito. It was briefly ruled from the Real Audiencia of Santa Fe during the brief suppression of the Real Audiencia of Quito.

== See also ==
- Viceroyalty of New Granada
- Gonzalo Jiménez de Quesada (founder)
- Viceroyalty of Peru
- Patria Boba
- United Provinces of New Granada
- Gran Colombia
