= Juan de la Cruz Mourgeón =

Spanish general and colonial administrator

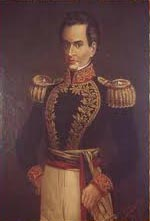
Juan de la Cruz Mourgeón

Juan de la Cruz Mourgeón y Achet (1766–1822) was a Spanish military commander and colonial administrator.

== Early career ==
He saw action during the War of the Pyrenees, both in Rosellón and in Cataluña. Wounded three times, he was promoted to lieutenant in 1875.

He then participated in the War of the Oranges.

== Peninsular War ==
In June 1808, the governor of Cadiz and Captain General of Andalusia, Tomás de Morla y Pacheco, commissioned Mourgeón with setting up the Battalion of Tiradores de Cadiz (Sharpshooters of Cadiz), for which he was promoted to lieutenant colonel. He led his battalion later that year at Baylen, for which he was promoted to colonel.

Leading the vanguard of Grimarest's 2nd Andalusian Division, part of General Castaños's Army of the Centre, which was defeated by Marshal Moncey at Lerín (25 October), Mourgeón and his troops found themselves surrounded by Morlot's division when Grimarest retreated. Mourgeón took refuge in the castle at Lerín with his troops, all new levies, and consisting of a single regular battalion, his Tiradores de Cadiz, and a few Catalan volunteers. They defended themselves there for two days, expecting Grimarest to come to their rescue, but he was decided not to. Mourgeón finally surrendered after two-thirds of his troops had been killed or wounded. Grimarest was reprimanded for his defeat at Lerín.

Mourgeón managed to escape from France and made his way to Cádiz, where he was rewarded with the promotion to brigadier in July 1810 and seeing action that year at Moguer (August 1810).

He saw further action at Barrosa (March 1811) and at Albuera (May 1811), after which he was promoted to field marshal.

== Post-war career ==
In 1821 the government of the Trienio Liberal appointed him captain general of New Kingdom of Granada and president of Quito.

He died in Quito in April 1822.

Government offices
Preceded by Juan José de Sámano y Uribarri	Viceroy of New Granada; 1819–1821	Succeeded by Title abolished
