= Andrés Díaz Venero de Leiva =

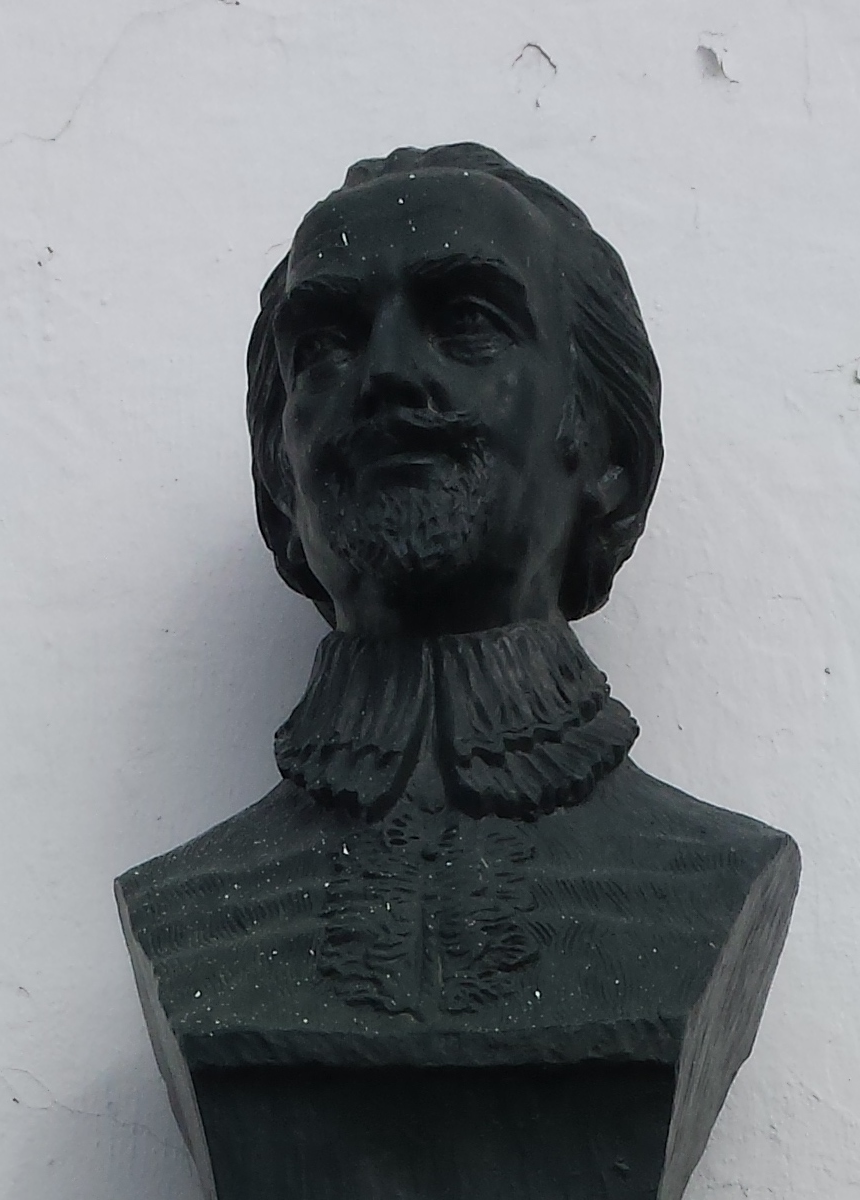
Andrés Díaz Venero de Leiva

Andrés Díaz Venero de Leiva (1495 – 1578) was the first president of the New Kingdom of Granada, appointed in 1564.

== Political rise to power ==
Venero de Leiva was born in El Castillo, a place near the port of Laredo, on the Cantabrian Sea. He was born to a noble family. He served as major convictor (a layman living in a college or seminary without being part of the regent community) in the Colegio de Santa Cruz in Valladolid. In 1548 he served as professor of higher and convictor Vespers and Santacruz Canons in the College of Valladolid. From there he was called to fill the position of prosecutor and judge of the Accounting Council of Castile in 1554.

In 1563 he left Spain for the Americas arriving in Bogotá (then called Santa Fe) in February 1564 where he was appointed as the first president of the Royal Audiencia of the New Kingdom of Granada between 1564 and 1574.

== Governmental affairs ==
The government of President Andres Diaz Venero de Leiva was a milestone in the political and institutional life of the New Kingdom, not only because it introduced a new form of government, but because it excelled in administrative measures to affirm the presence of Crown and the prevalence of their interests with the group of commissioners.

== Early actions ==
His first actions were aimed at reorganizing the Royal Court and try to improve the functioning of justice. He began by seeking harmony between the judges, hitherto engaged in quarrels and animosities of old data. He asked them to account for all convictions and legal expenses incurred in the last seven years for the mess and misinformation that showed he ordered officers from future registration of such data. And attracted the greatest sympathy to the Court imposing a higher work rate for the transaction of business dammed, some of the passions among the judges and others at the insistence of the litigants in attending the challenges. The effect of this measure was synthesized, in April 1565 by Mayor John Penagos in the following terms: "He encouragement to those who did not dare ask for fear (justice) and stopped with favors to those who wanted the alien" . By mandate of the Crown, Venero did the impeachment trial judge Perez de Melchor Arteaga and the entire staff under the Hearing, that is, reporters, camera clerks, receivers, attorneys and porters, on which weighed several charges; the judge found him guilty of excesses to function as a visitor in Cartagena. In the course of his administration, the president had to face high-profile court cases such as the soldier Francisco Bolivar, sentenced to death for various cruelties to the Indians and the murder of Jorge Voto for the children of the captain and conquistador Pedro Bravo de Rivera, Pedro and Hernan, who had the instigation of Ines Manrique, better known as Ines de Hinojosa. Venero described the crime as "the most heinous crime was committed in the Indies;" Tunja traveled with the case and issued its ruling that the chronicler Juan Rodriguez Freyle: "When Don Pedro confiscated the goods, the parcel as an informer, that was his, put it in the Crown, as it is today. slew the Don Pedro, his brother Hernan Bravo hanged at the corner of George Street Vote; and Dona Ines was hanged from a tree that was next to his door, which lives to this day, although dry ... "

Since the beginning of its mandate Venero de Leiva warned that ignored actual number of provisions and some had not even been published. New laws were violated in 1542 when the governors granted new permits for conquest, although this was a function of the Royal Court. The president attributed such outrages to the inexperience of the governors, they were not men of letters, to their condition and the remoteness of the hearing. So the judge sent as visitors Cepeda, Juan Lopez de Cartagena and Santa Marta, and Diego Garcia de Valverde tax for governor of Popayan. Control over the governors, the president said his opposition to develop expeditionary companies, among those not authorized are those of Diego de Ospina to the region of Antioquia and Diego de Vargas, who longed to find the coveted Golden on the Plains Orientals. As a result, the management Venero de Leiva (1564–1575) opened a parenthesis in the process of expansion of the conquest; considered necessary to curb the abuses of the conquistadores, both on the communities from which the Indians extracted dragged looting expeditions such as that performed in the people they conquered. Furthermore, it was essential to organize the space that had been conquered and lay the groundwork for colonization tasks. Result of such concerns was the founding pioneer of the Villa de Leiva, requested by several farmers who had recently arrived from Spain. The foundation, authorized by the president on April 29, 1572, left the city erectile guidelines to rely on the establishment of a layer of tenants who disputed the indigenous labor to the encomenderos of Tunja rivalry born too early between the two cities, as traders preferred to that for the quality and abundance of wheat crops.

== Indigenous concerns ==
Venero de Leiva was concerned with improving the situation of indigenous subjected to all sorts of indignities by the encomenderos group, which ignored the protectionist provisions of the Crown. The first thing was to remember the current rules on the treatment should be given to the Indians and the penalties for public or secret sale of parcels. Then he commanded the judges to make "visits the earth" to find out, among other things, the relationship of indigenous encomenderos and individuals, as well as to learn or change the tax rates. Diego de Villafane was in the villages in the district of Santa Fe in 1564, toured Castejón angle Anserma Carthage in 1568, Juan de Hinojosa visited Popayán in 1569, Garcia Valverde went to Pasto in 1570 and Lopez de Cepeda to Tunja and Velez in 1572. The president and abolished the hearers some personal services of the Indians, that is, they lent to the encomenderos without pay in wages existed, banning the employment of Indians included in herding, domestic service and supply of fuels and forages. Although they tried to modify the personal services in agriculture, this did not prosper because the pressure of the encomenderos. In relation to work in mines, Venero de Leiva admitted he had not dared run at exactly the royal charters "because it was destroying the whole kingdom" because no "there was another metal coin or hire men but gold ", there would be real fifth and the Indians would not have the money to pay the tribute. Against the quantitative decline of the indigenous population, the president advised the king in August 1564, which introduced "black at moderate prices" so that "the mines and wealth of these lands are removed and with plenty of [...] more easily, so that it results in universally good of all of your growing real estate. " The slaves took to the mines were not able to replace indigenous labor and the president decided in September 1570 to regulate the work of Indians in mining.

Provided that this work had a voluntary basis, and that the Indians who would be employed as laborers should receive six grains of gold per day, plus food and tools, set the working day in seven hours, "from nine o'clock until four p.m., leaving them at this time to eat and drink as usual with "after the four had to teach them Christian doctrine, as in" the holidays to save "the Indians were prohibited engaged in different jobs and moving to different climates "those who are born and bred" encomenderos authorized rent their Indians, but in a proportion not exceeding one tenth of the tributaries of the parcel, and ordered that each "entry clearance" should be a mayor and a "natural defense".

The persistence of indigenous people continue to worship their ancient gods and encomenderos complaints about the shortage of priests made Venero de Leiva will manage the coming of 40 religious of San Francisco and Santo Domingo. Around the same time and with the support of the Archbishop Fray Juan de los Barrios, were built over 40 churches and missions founded schools and grammar classes, arts and theology. The president also took measurements on trade. Between 1564 and 1565 addressed the complaints of the merchants against the encomenderos debtors and ordered that the first could seize all the assets of the second, even taxes that they paid the Indians, as well as arms and horses belonging to " veteran knights, "as called themselves the debtors. In 1566 the president put into effect the principle that a monopoly of trade belonged to the Crown, as opposed to the councils of some cities, like Velez or Tocaima, which had jurisdiction in ports on the Magdalena River of those who had derived revenue.

== Personal life and death ==
Venero de Leiva was married to Mary Ondegardo and Zarate, whose union had nine children. She may have contributed marginally in the administration. Freyle Rodriguez says: "I helped a lot to charity, because nobody was bereaved of his presence." However, the most serious charges were made to the president in his impeachment trial were related to the greed of his wife. Apparently, María intrigued before the court to favor in lawsuits to those who did get gifts, he served as intermediaries her maid Teresa Herrera, treasurer Pedro Fernandez del Busto and Fray Francisco de Olea. Among the beneficiaries of his "favors" included prominent figures such as the judge López de Cepeda and advance Gonzalo Jiménez de Quesada, the first indications are called to have avoided trial for killing a neighbor sticks of Santa Fe, thanks to some emeralds presented to Dona Maria. On the other mess they also arrived through several newly discovered emerald mines of Muzo, formed a voluminous court record in 1574. This year, before the judge of residence Francisco de Briceño, a neighbor of Muzo denounced the president's wife for not having paid more than 50 "ouches and Canute," and three large stones valued at $1,500 pesos "good gold" that were kept by the defendant saying that "one was very good for His Majesty, the other to the Consejo de Indias, and the other to Ruy Gómez de Silva." After several statements recognized the innocence of the president and his wife, due to the withdrawal of the complainant Alonso Ramírez soda. His memorial said: "I hesitate to ask not to turn away now or at any time that Dr. Venero and property by reason of anything above the apartment which I swear to God and the Cross I do so for fear of not your justice will be done, but it just causes that move and to understand that the demand contained in I have no justice. " Venero de Leiva returned to Spain in late 1574 and was appointed to the Council of the Indies. He died in Madrid on July 1, 1578.
