= Sebastián de Eslava =

Spanish General and Viceroy of New Granada

Su Excelencia General Don Sebastián de Eslava y Lazaga
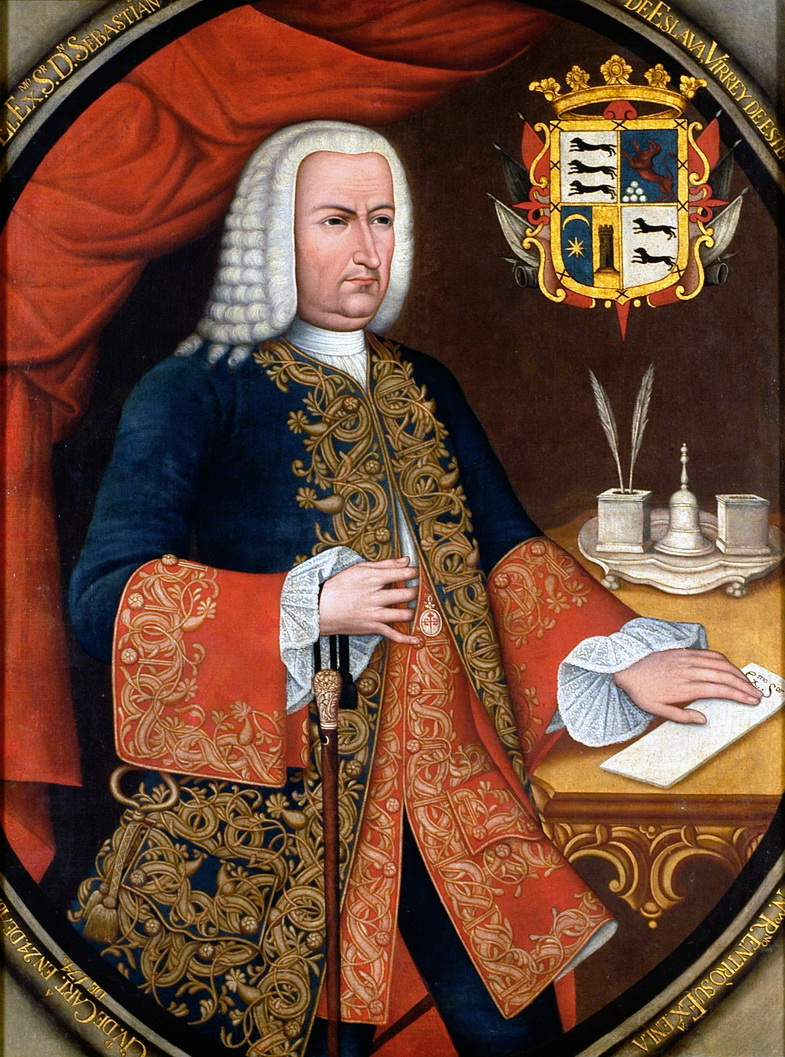
- Sebastián de Eslava, Viceroy of New Granada (1740–1749)
- Born: January 19, 1685; Enériz, Kingdom of Navarre, Spanish Empire
- Died: June 21, 1759 (aged 74); Madrid, Spanish Empire
- Relatives: Gaspar de Eslava y Berrio (father); Rafaela de Lazaga Eguiarreta y Paradis (mother); Agustín de Eslava (brother); José Fermín de Eslava (brother); Francisco Martín de Eslava (brother); Rafael de Eslava (brother)
- Military career
- Allegiance: Spanish Empire (Spain) Viceroyalty of New Granada
- Service years: 1702–1759
- Conflicts: War of Spanish Succession: Twelfth siege of Gibraltar; Siege of Barcelona (1706); Battle of Almansa; Battle of Almenar; Battle of Saragossa; Battle of Brihuega; Battle of Villaviciosa; Siege of Barcelona (1713–1714); Bourbon conquest of the Two Sicilies Campaigns of Muley Ismaíl (1678–1727): Sieges of Ceuta (1694–1727); Spanish-Barbary Wars: Spanish conquest of Oran (1732); War of Jenkins' Ear: Battle of Cartagena de Indias

Viceroy of New Granada
- In office 24 April 1740 – 6 November 1749
- Monarchs: Philip V Ferdinand VI
- First Secretary of State: Marquess of Villarías; José de Carvajal
- Secretary of State for the Navy and the Indies: Marquess of Villarías; Marquess of Ensenada
- Preceded by: Jorge de Villalonga (1724)
- Succeeded by: José Alfonso Pizarro

Secretary of State for War of Spain
- In office 22 July 1754 – 21 June 1759
- Monarch: Ferdinand VI
- First Secretary of State: Ricardo Wall
- Preceded by: Marquess of Ensenada
- Succeeded by: Ricardo Wall

Sebastián de Eslava y Lazaga (January 19, 1685 – June 21, 1759) was a general and colonial official for Spain. From April 24, 1740 to November 6, 1749 he was viceroy of the newly reestablished Viceroyalty of New Granada. He was governing the viceregal at the time of the defeat of British Admiral Edward Vernon at the Battle of Cartagena de Indias. After his death he was named marqués de la Real Defensa de Cartagena de Indias.

== The reestablishment of the Viceroyalty of New Granada ==
In 1740 the Viceroyalty of the Nuevo Reino de Granada (New Granada) was reestablished. This part of South America, including what are today the countries of Venezuela, Colombia, Panama and Ecuador, had originally been part of the Viceroyalty of Peru. It was removed from Peru and established as the separate viceroyalty of New Granada in 1718. However, this first viceregal establishment lasted only from 1718 to 1724. In 1724 it was returned to Peru.

There were difficulties governing this large territory from Lima, however. In 1740 New Granada was reestablished as a viceroyalty, for the same reasons as it had originally been established — large distances, growing population, tax collection, defense, and administrative control. In August 1739 Sebastián de Eslava was named the first viceroy of this second incarnation, with express instructions from the Crown to defend the viceregal against British attacks.

== Beginning of his term as viceroy ==
Eslava studied at the Royal Military Academy in Barcelona. He was a lieutenant general in the Royal Army of Spain and commander in the Order of Calatrava. In April 1740 he arrived at Cartagena de Indias. He remained there for the duration of his term as viceroy, not traveling to the interior.

He repaired the Castle of Bocachica and various forts protecting the port. In the Castle of San Lázaro he started a factory of gun carriages and esplanades. He took steps to supply arms, ammunition and military training to the Spanish forces. Elsewhere in the viceregal, he built defensive works in Santa Marta, Puerto Cabello and Gaira. He strengthened the fort at Araya and the Castle of San Antonio in the province of Cumaná. He approved the construction of the fort on the islet of Caño de Limones and equipped the presidio of Guayana.

== The War of Jenkins' Ear ==
These steps were necessary because Britain, fighting for the commercial control of America, declared war on Spain in 1739 (the War of Jenkins' Ear). The defense of the coast was essential.

On November 21, 1739 British Admiral Edward Vernon captured Portobelo, on the Atlantic side of the Isthmus of Panama, which was part of the new Viceroyalty. This was just before Eslava's arrival in Cartagena as viceroy of the colony. After this success, Vernon turned his attention to Cartagena. On March 13, 1741 he blockaded the port with 51 warships, 135 transports, 2,000 cannon and more than 28,000 men, possibly the strongest fleet ever assembled up to this time. The city was defended by the Spanish Admiral Blas de Lezo, who had at his command 3,000 Spanish troops, 600 Indian archers, and six Ships of the Line. He also relied on his careful preparations and the sturdy fortifications of the city.

On the night of April 19, as part of the battle of Cartagena de Indias, the British began a major assault on the wall of the fort of San Felipe. However, the attackers soon found that their scaling ladders were shorter than the walls they were attacking. The British were unable to advance and impeded from retreating by the equipment they carried. The Spanish opened fire on them, and then counterattacked outside the walls with bayonets. The carnage was great, and the remaining British soldiers were forced to remain on board their ships, with provisions running out.

Vernon finally had to raise the blockade and return to Jamaica. Eight thousand British were said to have died, against only 1,000 Spanish. Blas de Lezo, who had already lost a leg, an eye and an arm in other battles, lost his life after this one, dying of disease.

== After the siege of Cartagena ==
During his administration, Viceroy Eslava founded hospitals and towns, constructed roads, promoted the pacification of the Motilones Indians, and contributed arms, money and provisions to defend some cities (like Pamplona and San Faustino), and to maintain navigation on the Zulia River. He built 20 churches, repaired and enlarged others, protected the established missions and organized those of Darién, in Panama. He improved the finances of the colony and the administration of justice.

He left New Granada for Spain on February 23, 1750. After his return to Spain, King Ferdinand VI named him captain general of Andalucia, and later, on July 2, 1754, minister of war. In 1760 he was posthumously granted the title of marqués de la Real Defensa de Cartagena de Indias.

== Bibliography ==
- (in Spanish) Colmenares, Germán (Ed.) Relaciones e informes de Los gobernantes de la Nueva Granada. Bogotá: Banco Popular, 1989.
- (in Spanish) Restrepo Sáenz, José María. Biografías de los mandatarios y ministros de la Real Audiencia (1671 a 1819). Bogotá: Academia Colombiana de Historia, 1952.
- (in Spanish) Rodríguez Maldonado, Carlos. "Don Sebastián de Eslava y don Blas de Lezo". Boletín de historia y antigüedades (Bogota). Vol. 39, No. 447-448 (Jan./Feb. 1952), pp. 76–84.
- Beatson, Robert. Naval and Military Memoirs of Great Britain, from 1727 to 1783, London, 1804.
- Hart, Francis Russle. Admirals of the Caribbean, Boston, 1922.
- Fortescue, J. W. A History of the British Army, MacMillan, London, 1899, Vol. II.

Government offices
| Preceded by none (Jorge de Villalonga in 1724) | Viceroy of New Granada; 1740–1749 | Succeeded by José Alfonso Pizarro |
