= List of viceroys of New Granada =

Viceroy of New Granada
- Coat of arms of Colonial-era Bogotá

- Flag of Spain
- Appointer: King of Spain
- Formation: 1718
- First holder: Antonio Ignacio de la Pedrosa y Guerrero
- Final holder: Juan de la Cruz Mourgeón
- Abolished: 1821

Spanish viceroys of the colonial Viceroyalty of New Granada (1717–1819) located in northern South America.

== Introduction ==
The territory within the former Viceroyalty of New Granada corresponds to areas in present-day Colombia, Ecuador, Panama, and Venezuela. It also encompassed smaller territories located in present-day Guyana, southwestern Suriname, northwestern Brazil, northern Peru, Costa Rica, and Nicaragua.

From the initial Spanish colonization of northern South America in the 1540's to the Viceroyalty of New Granada's establishment in 1718, the territories were governed by the Viceroyalty of Peru (1542–1824). They included the included smaller colonial Audiencia Real of Bogotá and New Kingdom of Granada. In 1777 the provinces of Venezuela were assigned to the new colonial Captaincy General of Venezuela (1777–1821), governed by Captains General.

The territories of the viceroyalty gained independence from Spain between 1810 and 1822 after a series of military and political struggles, uniting in the republic of Gran Colombia (1821–1831).

== Viceroys ==
| No. | Portrait | Name (birth–death) | Birthplace | Term | | Official title | Monarch | Prime Minister |
| No. | Portrait | Name (birth–death) | Birthplace | Start | End | Official title | Monarch | Prime Minister |
|---|---|---|---|---|---|---|---|---|
• Viceroyalty of New Granada •
| – | | Antonio Ignacio de la Pedrosa y Guerrero* (c. 1660–c. 1723) | unknown Seville | 13 June 1718 | 25 November 1719 | Governor and Captain General of the New Kingdom of Granada | Philip V (1714–1724) | José de Grimaldo (1714–1724) |
| 1 | | Jorge de Villalonga (1664–1740) | Palma; Majorca | 25 November 1719 | 11 May 1724 | 1st Viceroy of the New Kingdom of Granada | Philip V (1714–1724) Louis I (1724) | José de Grimaldo (1714–1724) |
| 1 | | Jorge de Villalonga (1664–1740) | Palma; Majorca | 25 November 1719 | 11 May 1724 | 1st Viceroy of the New Kingdom of Granada | Philip V (1714–1724) Louis I (1724) | Juan Bautista de Orendáin (1724) |
The Viceroyalty of New Granada was reincorporated into the Viceroyalty of Peru from 1724 to 1740.
| 2 | | Sebastián de Eslava (1685–1759) | Enériz; Navarre | 20 April 1740 | 6 November 1749 | 2nd Viceroy of the New Kingdom of Granada | Philip V (1724–1746) Ferdinand VI (1746–1759) | Sebastián de la Cuadra (1736–1746) |
| 2 | | Sebastián de Eslava (1685–1759) | Enériz; Navarre | 20 April 1740 | 6 November 1749 | 2nd Viceroy of the New Kingdom of Granada | Philip V (1724–1746) Ferdinand VI (1746–1759) | José de Carvajal (1746–1754) |
| 3 | | José Alfonso Pizarro (1689–1762) | Sahagún; León | 6 November 1749 | 24 November 1753 | 3rd Viceroy of the New Kingdom of Granada | Ferdinand VI (1746–1759) | José de Carvajal (1746–1754) |
| 4 | | José Solís Folch de Cardona (1716–1770) | Madrid; Castile | 24 November 1753 | 25 February 1761 | 4th Viceroy of the New Kingdom of Granada | Ferdinand VI (1746–1759) Charles III (1759–1788) | José de Carvajal (1746–1754) |
| 4 | | José Solís Folch de Cardona (1716–1770) | Madrid; Castile | 24 November 1753 | 25 February 1761 | 4th Viceroy of the New Kingdom of Granada | Ferdinand VI (1746–1759) Charles III (1759–1788) | Fernando de Silva (1754) |
| 4 | | José Solís Folch de Cardona (1716–1770) | Madrid; Castile | 24 November 1753 | 25 February 1761 | 4th Viceroy of the New Kingdom of Granada | Ferdinand VI (1746–1759) Charles III (1759–1788) | Ricardo Wall (1754–1763) |
| 5 | | Pedro Mesía de la Cerda (1700–1783) | Córdoba; Córdoba | 25 February 1761 | 31 October 1772 | 5th Viceroy of the New Kingdom of Granada | Charles III (1759–1788) | Ricardo Wall (1754–1763) |
| 5 | | Pedro Mesía de la Cerda (1700–1783) | Córdoba; Córdoba | 25 February 1761 | 31 October 1772 | 5th Viceroy of the New Kingdom of Granada | Charles III (1759–1788) | Jerónimo Grimaldi (1763–1777) |
| 6 | | Manuel de Guirior (1708–1788) | Aoiz; Navarre | 31 October 1772 | 17 July 1776 | 6th Viceroy of the New Kingdom of Granada | Charles III (1759–1788) | Jerónimo Grimaldi (1763–1777) |
| 7 | | Manuel Antonio Flórez Maldonado (1723–1799) | Seville; Seville | 17 July 1776 | 26 November 1781 | 7th Viceroy of the New Kingdom of Granada | Charles III (1759–1788) | Jerónimo Grimaldi (1763–1777) |
| 7 | | Manuel Antonio Flórez Maldonado (1723–1799) | Seville; Seville | 17 July 1776 | 26 November 1781 | 7th Viceroy of the New Kingdom of Granada | Charles III (1759–1788) | José Moñino (1777–1792) |
The office of viceroy remained vacant from 26 November 1781 to 2 April 1782. The Real Audiencia of Santa Fe de Bogotá ruled during this period.
| 8 | | Juan de Torrezar Díaz Pimienta (unknown–1782) | unknown Biscay | 2 April 1782 | 11 June 1782 | 8th Viceroy of the New Kingdom of Granada | Charles III (1759–1788) | José Moñino (1777–1792) |
The office of viceroy remained vacant from 2 April 1782 to 11 June 1782. The Real Audiencia of Santa Fe de Bogotá ruled during this period.
| 9 | | Antonio Caballero y Góngora (1723–1796) | Priego de Córdoba; Córdoba | 11 July 1782 | June 1789 | 9th Viceroy of the New Kingdom of Granada | Charles III (1759–1788) Charles IV (1788–1808) | José Moñino (1777–1792) |
| 10 | | Francisco Gil de Taboada (1733–1810) | Sotolongo; Galicia | June 1789 | 4 March 1790 | 10th Viceroy of the New Kingdom of Granada | Charles IV (1788–1808) | José Moñino (1777–1792) |
| 11 | | José Manuel de Ezpeleta (1742–1823) | Pamplona; Navarre | 4 March 1790 | 1 January 1797 | 11th Viceroy of the New Kingdom of Granada | Charles IV (1788–1808) | José Moñino (1777–1792) |
| 11 | | José Manuel de Ezpeleta (1742–1823) | Pamplona; Navarre | 4 March 1790 | 1 January 1797 | 11th Viceroy of the New Kingdom of Granada | Charles IV (1788–1808) | Pedro Pablo Abarca (1792) |
| 11 | | José Manuel de Ezpeleta (1742–1823) | Pamplona; Navarre | 4 March 1790 | 1 January 1797 | 11th Viceroy of the New Kingdom of Granada | Charles IV (1788–1808) | Manuel Godoy (1792–1798) |
| 12 | | Pedro Mendinueta (1736–1825) | Elizondo; Navarre | 1 January 1797 | 16 September 1803 | 12th Viceroy of the New Kingdom of Granada | Charles IV (1788–1808) | Manuel Godoy (1792–1798) |
| 12 | | Pedro Mendinueta (1736–1825) | Elizondo; Navarre | 1 January 1797 | 16 September 1803 | 12th Viceroy of the New Kingdom of Granada | Charles IV (1788–1808) | Francisco Saavedra (1798–1799) |
| 12 | | Pedro Mendinueta (1736–1825) | Elizondo; Navarre | 1 January 1797 | 16 September 1803 | 12th Viceroy of the New Kingdom of Granada | Charles IV (1788–1808) | Mariano de Urquijo (1799) |
| 12 | | Pedro Mendinueta (1736–1825) | Elizondo; Navarre | 1 January 1797 | 16 September 1803 | 12th Viceroy of the New Kingdom of Granada | Charles IV (1788–1808) | Pedro Cevallos (1799–1808) |
| 13 | Painting of Viceroy Amar y Borbón | Antonio José Amar y Borbón (1742–1826) | Zaragoza; Aragon | 16 September 1803 | 20 July 1810 | 13th Viceroy of the New Kingdom of Granada | Charles IV (1788–1808) Ferdinand VII (1808) | Pedro Cevallos (1799–1808) |
| 13 | Painting of Viceroy Amar y Borbón | Antonio José Amar y Borbón (1742–1826) | Zaragoza; Aragon | 16 September 1803 | 20 July 1810 | 13th Viceroy of the New Kingdom of Granada | Charles IV (1788–1808) Ferdinand VII (1808) | Gonzalo O'Farrill (1808) |
| 13 | Painting of Viceroy Amar y Borbón | Antonio José Amar y Borbón (1742–1826) | Zaragoza; Aragon | 16 September 1803 | 20 July 1810 | 13th Viceroy of the New Kingdom of Granada | Charles IV (1788–1808) Ferdinand VII (1808) | Pedro Cevallos (1808) |
On 20 July 1810, the Supreme Governing Junta of New Granada is created by a declaration of the Cabildo (City Council) of Santa Fe, marking the start of the Colombian War of Independence. Amar y Borbón ruled as president of the junta from July 20, 1810 to July 25, 1810. For further republican rulers see List of presidents of Colombia.
| – | | Francisco Xavier Venegas** (1754–1838) | Zafra; Extremadura | 20 July 1810 | 14 September 1810 | Titular viceroy of the New Kingdom of Granada | Ferdinand VII (Hostage: 1808–1813) | Vacant |
The office of viceroy remained vacant from 14 September 1810 to 21 March 1812, due to most of the territory being ruled by the independentist presidents of the Free and Independent State of Cundinamarca and the United Provinces of New Granada.
| 14 | | Benito Pérez Brito (1747–1813) | Barcelona; Catalonia | 21 March 1812 | November 1812 | 14th Viceroy of the New Kingdom of Granada | Ferdinand VII (Hostage: 1808–1813) | Vacant |
The office of viceroy remained vacant from November, 1812 to 16 April 1816, due to most of the territory being ruled by the independentist presidents of the Free and Independent State of Cundinamarca and the United Provinces of New Granada. The viceroyalty was re-established in 1816 after the reconquest of the territory by Spain.
| 15 | | Francisco José Montalvo (1754–1822) | La Habana; Cuba | 16 April 1816 | 9 March 1818 | 15th Viceroy of the New Kingdom of Granada | Ferdinand VII (1813–1833) | Pedro Cevallos (1816) |
| 15 | | Francisco José Montalvo (1754–1822) | La Habana; Cuba | 16 April 1816 | 9 March 1818 | 15th Viceroy of the New Kingdom of Granada | Ferdinand VII (1813–1833) | José García de León (1816–11818) |
| 16 | | Juan José de Sámano (1753–1821) | Selaya; Castile | 9 March 1818 | 9 August 1819 | 16th Viceroy of the New Kingdom of Granada | Ferdinand VII (1813–1833) | José García de León (1816–1818) |
| 16 | | Juan José de Sámano (1753–1821) | Selaya; Castile | 9 March 1818 | 9 August 1819 | 16th Viceroy of the New Kingdom of Granada | Ferdinand VII (1813–1833) | Carlos Martínez (1818–1819) |
| 16 | | Juan José de Sámano (1753–1821) | Selaya; Castile | 9 March 1818 | 9 August 1819 | 16th Viceroy of the New Kingdom of Granada | Ferdinand VII (1813–1833) | Manuel González (1819) |
Simón Bolívar captures Santa Fe, the capital of the viceroyalty, after the independentist victory at the Battle of Boyacá. Bolívar begins to rule as president of Colombia and viceroy Juan de Sámano is forced to leave the city. A new viceroy is appointed, ruling from Quito instead. For further republican rulers see List of presidents of Colombia.
| 17 | | Juan de la Cruz Mourgeon* (1766–1822) | Seville; Seville | 9 August 1819 | 8 April 1822 | Captain General of Santa Fe in the New Kingdom of Granada | Ferdinand VII (1813–1833) | Manuel González (1819) |
| 17 | | Juan de la Cruz Mourgeon* (1766–1822) | Seville; Seville | 9 August 1819 | 8 April 1822 | Captain General of Santa Fe in the New Kingdom of Granada | Ferdinand VII (1813–1833) | Joaquín Malgrejo (1818–1820) |
| 17 | | Juan de la Cruz Mourgeon* (1766–1822) | Seville; Seville | 9 August 1819 | 8 April 1822 | Captain General of Santa Fe in the New Kingdom of Granada | Ferdinand VII (1813–1833) | Evaristo Pérez (1820–1821) |
| 17 | | Juan de la Cruz Mourgeon* (1766–1822) | Seville; Seville | 9 August 1819 | 8 April 1822 | Captain General of Santa Fe in the New Kingdom of Granada | Ferdinand VII (1813–1833) | Eusebio Bardají (1821–1822) |
The office of viceroy remained vacant from 8 April 1822 until the dissolution of the viceroyalty on 25 May 1822. For further republican rulers see List of presidents of Colombia.

*Acting viceroy (without the formal title)

*Acting viceroy (without the formal title)

**He was named to the post but did not formally occupy it.

== See also ==
- Viceroyalty of New Granada
- Viceroyalty of New Granada topics
- History of Colombia
- List of presidents of Colombia
