= Jorge de Villalonga =

Spanish lawyer, general and viceroy

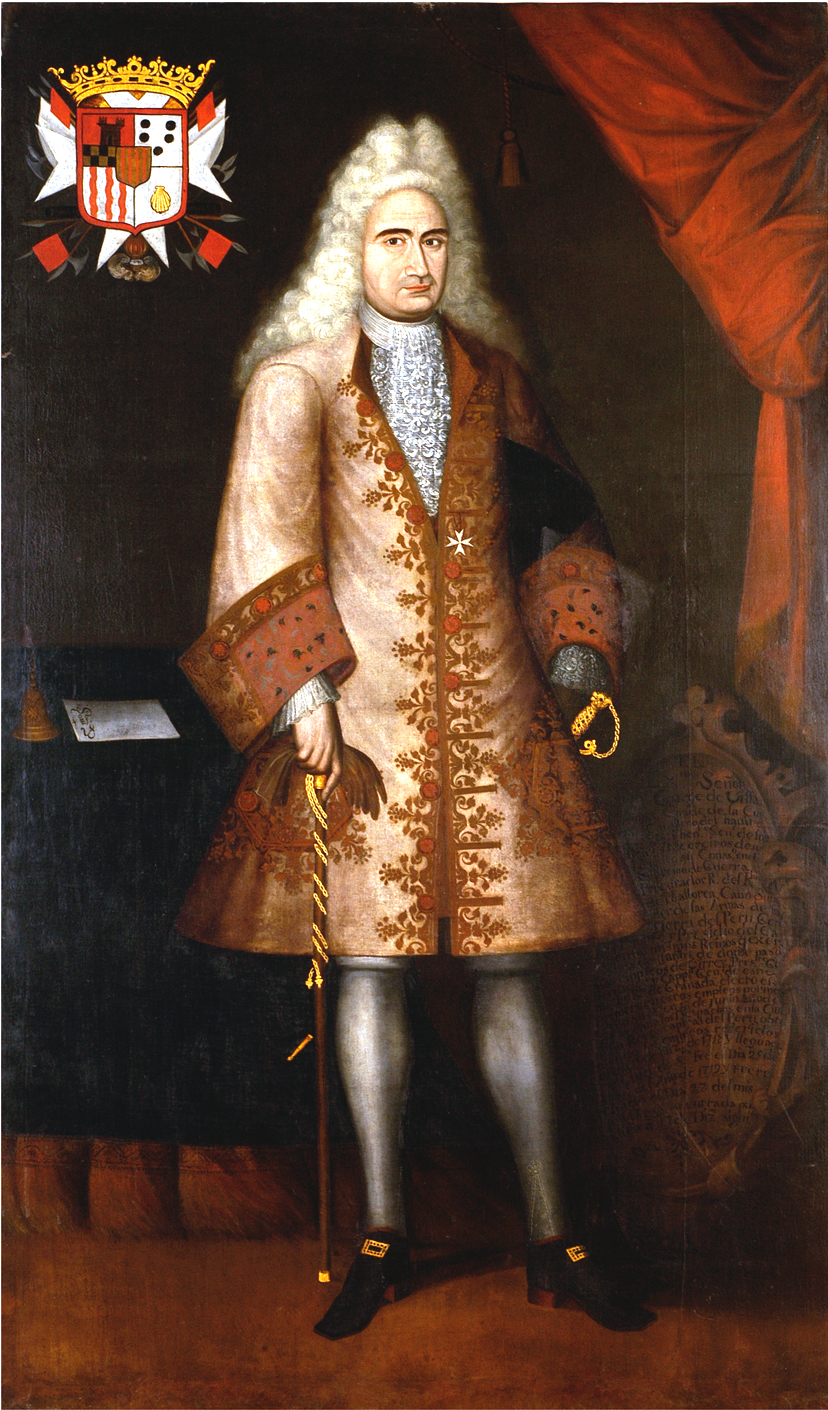
Jorge de Villalonga, Viceroy of New Granada, 1719-24

Jorge de Villalonga, segundo conde de la Cueva (born 1664) was a Spanish lawyer, general and the first official viceroy of New Granada, from November 25, 1719 to May 11, 1724.

== Biography ==
Villalonga was a knight of the Sovereign Military Order of Malta. In the army, he rose to the rank of lieutenant general. He was a member of the council of war and a solicitor in the Kingdom of Majorca. In Madrid, he married his niece Catalina María de Villalonga y de Velasco, daughter of his brother Francisco. In 1708 he was placed in charge of the port and presidio of Callao, Peru.

On December 15, 1718 while he was serving as head of the army in Peru, he received the news that he had been named the first official viceroy of the recently created Viceroyalty of New Granada. The new colony included the present-day countries of Venezuela, Colombia, Panama and Ecuador. Until May 27, 1717, this territory had been part of the Viceroyalty of Peru.

Villalonga made a long overland trip to take up his new post, stopping on the way in Quito and Popayán. On December 17, 1718, he made a great impression on the inhabitants of Santa Fe de Bogotá by the great pomp of his formal entrance into the capital. His lifestyle thereafter continued to contrast greatly with the poverty of most of the inhabitants of the city.

The viceroy had specific orders to clean up the disorder and corruption rampant among the royal officials of the colony. In 1722 he brought charges against the accountant Domingo de Mena. Nevertheless, his administration was known for its arbitrariness and corruption. Villalonga's instructions also specified that he was to prevent the development of wine-making and textile industries in the colony, in order to protect the Spanish industries from the competition. In November 1720, Spanish forces attacked the long-time Dutch settlement in Tucacas, on the coast of what is now Venezuela. This was a center of the contraband trade. It was largely destroyed by the Spanish, including a synagogue that was located there.

In 1721, following orders from the cabinet in Madrid, Villalonga expelled all foreigners, both residents and temporary visitors, not excluding men married to women born in the colony. He took direct control of the treasury. He improved the civil registry and aided in the foundation of the Jesuit college in the city of Santa Fe de Antioquia.

Viceroy Villalonga sent repeated recommendations to the Crown to abolish the viceroyalty and reestablish the earlier government under Peru, for the sake of economy. He argued that the colony was too poor to support viceregal government, there being few Spaniards and many Indians within its borders. In September 1723, three years into Villalonga's administration, the King Philip V issued the order to do that. The reunification took effect on May 11, 1724. Villalonga left Bogotá on May 31 of that year. The two colonies remained reunited until 1740, when the Viceroyalty of New Granada was established once again, this time permanently.

== See also ==
- List of viceroys of New Granada

Government offices
Preceded by Antonio de la Pedrosa y Guerrero	Viceroy of New Granada; 1719–1724	Succeeded by none (Sebastián de Eslava in 1740)
