= José Solís Folch de Cardona =

Spanish colonial administrator and viceroy (1716–1770)

The Most Excellent José Solís Folch de Cardona KOS
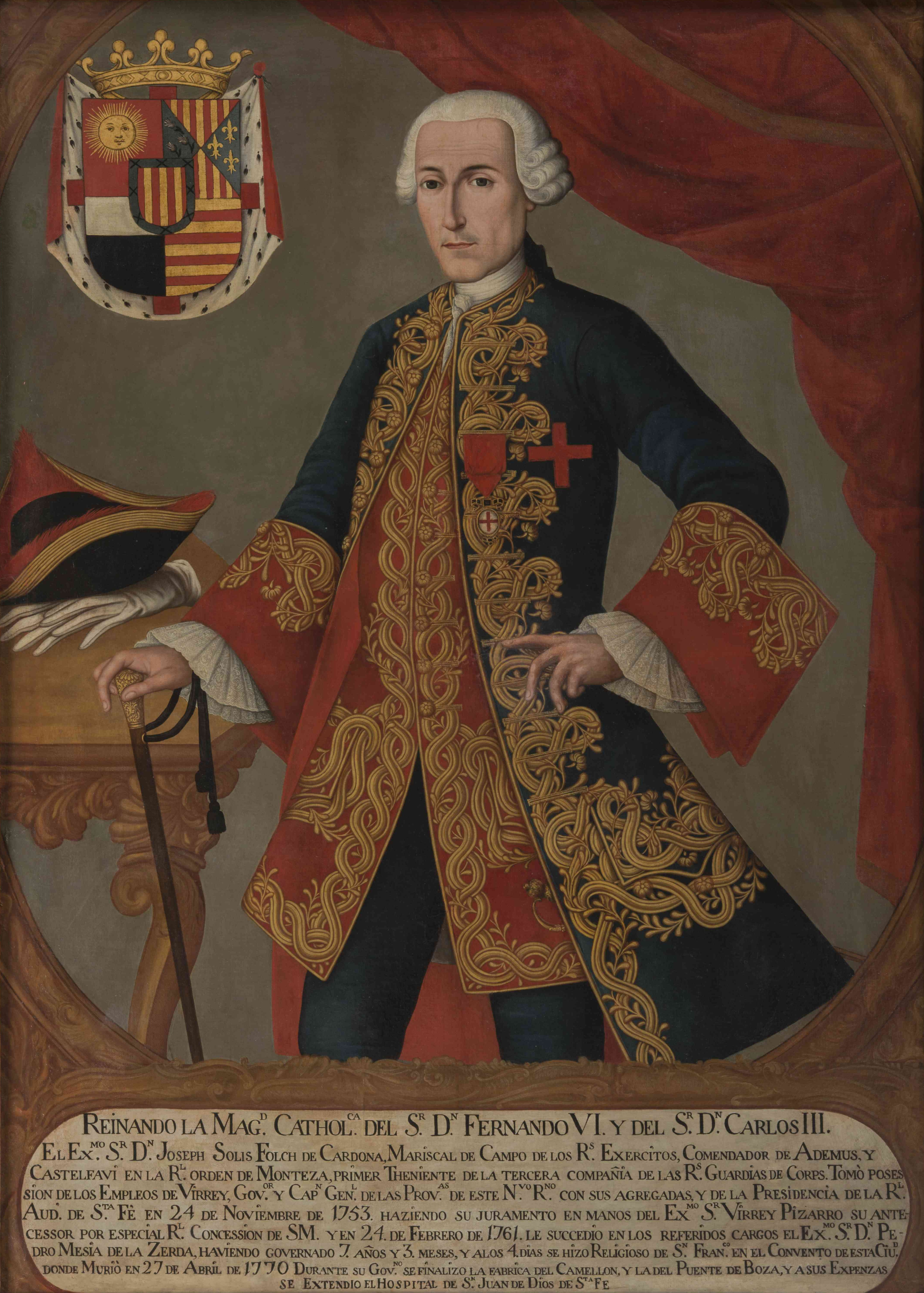

5th Viceroy of New Granada
- In office 24 November 1753 – 25 February 1761
- Monarchs: Ferdinand VI; Charles III
- Preceded by: José Alfonso Pizarro
- Succeeded by: Pedro Messía de la Cerda

Personal details
- Born: 4 February 1716 Madrid, Spain
- Died: 27 April 1770 (aged 54) Bogotá, New Granada
- Parents: José Solís y Gante, 3rd Duke of Montellano (father); Josefa Folch de Cardona y Belvís de Moncada (mother)

José Solís y Folch de Cardona, grande de España and knight of the Order of Santiago (4 February 1716 in Madrid – 27 April 1770 in Bogotá) was a Spanish colonial administrator and viceroy of New Granada from 24 November 1753 to 25 February 1761.

== Background ==
Solís y Folch de Cardona was a son of José Solís y Gante, 3rd Duke of Montellano, one of the original members of the Real Academia Española. His brother Francisco de Solís y Folch de Cardona (1713-1775) was a Roman Catholic cardinal. José was a cavalry colonel from 1736 to 1747, in charge of a regiment. Spanish King Ferdinand VI named him viceroy of New Granada.

== As viceroy ==
He inaugurated an era of ostentatious ceremony previously unknown in this Spanish colony. He fortified the mint, built roads, bridges and aqueducts (including that of Santa Fé de Bogotá) and established missions. He ordered the first census of the colony. He took steps to secure the submission of the Motilon, Chimila and Cunacuna indigenous people of Darién. He also reorganized the postal service and improved tax collection and the performance of the Audiencia. He tried to organize the mineral industry and internal commerce. He reestablished the chair of medicine at the Colegio del Rosario. In addition he formed a commission to establish the boundaries with the Portuguese colony of Brazil.

He founded the Hospital San Juan de Dios and assisted many people during an epidemic of measles.

He was known for his thoroughness, justice and integrity, and was well beloved by his subjects. He fell in love with María Lugarda Ospina, known as la Marichuela. They had several children who bore the last name Celís. Nevertheless, both the cabildo and the archbishop of Bogotá asked the king to extend his mandate when it first expired after three years.

== Juicio de residencia ==
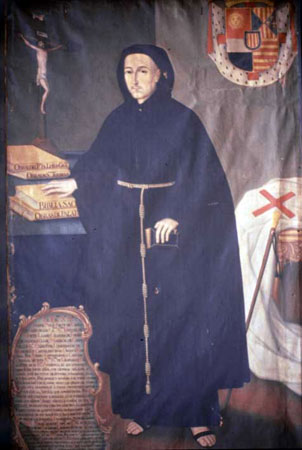
Portrait of José Solís Foch de Cardona as fray José de Jesús María

He had some disputes with the Audiencia. His opponents charged him with various offenses in the juicio de residencia (trial of grievances) that followed his administration. This was a nearly routine investigation at the end of a viceregal administration. However, that of Solís was more than routine. Six months of testimony was taken, and the report forwarded to the Council of the Indies contained more than 20,000 sheets. The judge in the case was Miguel de Santisteban, whom the viceroy had considered his best friend, and who had held high positions in the viceregal government. The judgment of the court was that Solís was guilty of 22 of the charges, all relating to fraud or mismanagement of the viceregal treasury. This judgment was delivered on 25 August 1762 but Solís had by then entered the monastery.

The case was appealed to the Council of the Indies, which found Solís not guilty on all counts on 29 August 1764. The Council also praised him for the "love, fervor, effectiveness and dispatch" he had exhibited in his seven-year term of office.

== Religious life ==
After turning over the office to his successor, Pedro Messía de la Cerda, he became a monk in a Franciscan convent (25 February 1761). (He had been a member of the Third Order of Franciscans before he became viceroy.) He helped finance the construction of the church of the Third Order in Bogotá, and donated the bells and clock for the Church of San Francisco. He gave away the rest of his property to the poor and lived sequestered until his death in 1770, in Bogotá. Fray José de Jesús María (as he was known after taking the habit) became a priest in 1769. That year he was recommended to the king by the political and religious leaders of Bogotá as the next archbishop.

He never held that position. He died on 27 April 1770 in Bogotá, of a cold contracted at Easter. His skull is conserved in the sacristy of the Church of San Francisco in Bogotá.

Government offices
Preceded by José Alfonso Pizarro	Viceroy of New Granada; 1753–1761	Succeeded by Pedro Messía de la Cerda
