= José Alfonso Pizarro =

Spanish naval officer and colonial administrator

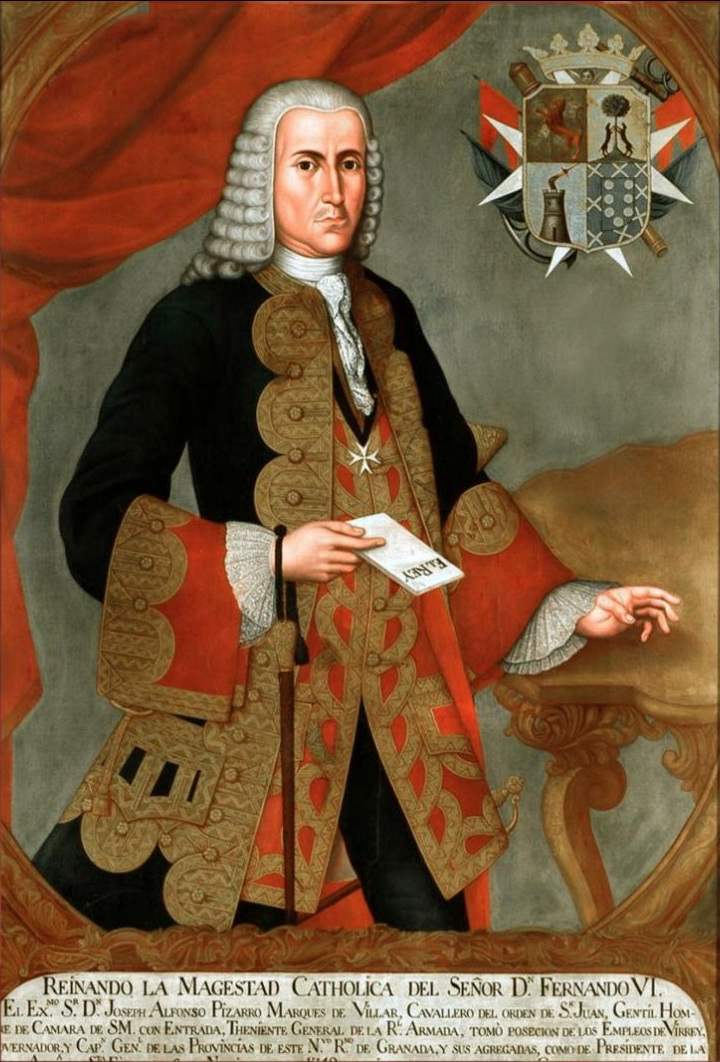
Admiral José Alfonso Pizarro, Viceroy of New Granada, 1749–1753

José Alfonso Pizarro, Marquis del Villar (sometimes given as José Alonso Pizarro) (1689 in Murcia – 1762 in Madrid) was a Spanish naval officer and colonial administrator. From November 6, 1749, to November 24, 1753, he was viceroy of the Spanish Viceroyalty of New Granada.

== Biography ==
As a youth Pizarro entered the naval service of the Knights of Malta. He was a knight of the Order and gentleman of the bedchamber of the king. Later he served in the Spanish navy, rising to the rank of rear admiral.

When the Spanish government heard of the expedition of British Admiral George Anson to the Pacific, a fleet of two ships of the line and four frigates was despatched with a regiment of infantry for Chile. The fleet, under Pizarro's command, left in October 1740, and arrived on January 5, 1741, in the Río de la Plata. Hearing that Anson was refitting in Santa Catharina for entering the Pacific by the Strait of Le Maire (off the southeast tip of Tierra del Fuego), Pizarro sailed at once to intercept him. His squadron consisting of the ships Asia (64 guns), Guipúzcoa (74), Hermione (54) and Esperanza (50) and the frigate San Estéban (40). However, he lost one ship and one frigate in a storm and was obliged to put back for repairs. On the second attempt, with two vessels, he was again dismasted and returned to Montevideo. From there, he despatched the frigate Esperanza to the Pacific, and crossed the Andes to Peru, where for some time he exercised the functions of naval commander-in-chief.

After the peace with England, Pizarro left the frigate on the Pacific station and returned overland to Montevideo, where he found his flagship, the Asia, refitted. He sailed in the Asia for Europe in November 1745. Part of the crew consisted of Indians from the pampas, who one night rose against the Spaniards, killing the watch on deck. They had gained possession of the vessel when Pizarro succeeded in killing the ringleader, and in the confusion drove the mutineers into the sea.

On his arrival at Cádiz in January 1746, Pizarro was promoted to vice-admiral. In 1749, he was appointed viceroy and captain general of New Granada. He arrived in Cartagena de Indias in the frigate Uaricochea in early November 1749, and was sworn in by his predecessor, Sebastián de Eslava.

Pizarro formed a monopoly of aguardiente, which provoked riots. He reorganized the mint. He improved communications with Bogotá. He began the construction of the mortar and stone bridge of San Antonio, over the junction of the Río San Agustín and the Río San Francisco in Bogotá. This latter work was completed by his successor, José Solís Folch de Cardona.

Pizarro served until 1753, when he turned over the government to his successor and returned to Spain.

== Notes ==
Government offices
| Preceded by Sebastián de Eslava | Viceroy of New Granada; 1749–1753 | Succeeded by José Solís Folch de Cardona |
