= Enériz =

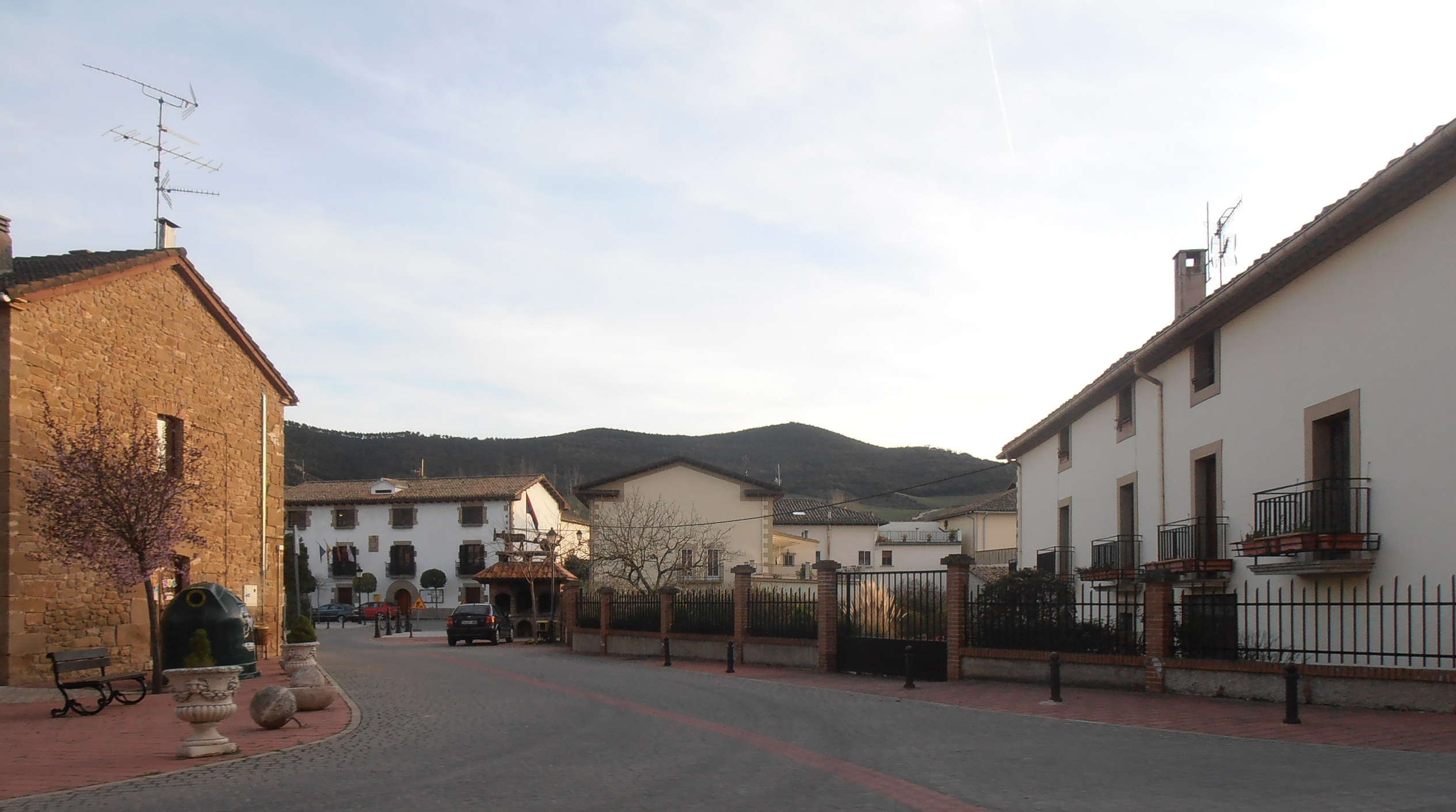

- Coat of arms

- Location of Enériz within Navarre Location of Enériz within Spain
- Coordinates: 42°40′N 1°43′W
- Country: Spain
- Autonomous community: Navarra

Government
  - Mayor: José Alberto Valencia Trueba

Area
  - Total: 9.45 km^{2} (3.65 sq mi)
- Elevation: 423 m (1,388 ft)

Population (2025-01-01)
  - Total: 328
  - Density: 34.7/km^{2} (89.9/sq mi)
- Time zone: UTC+1 (CET)
  - Summer (DST): UTC+2 (CEST)

Enériz is a town and municipality located in the province and autonomous community of Navarre, northern Spain.
