= Antonio Ignacio de la Pedrosa y Guerrero =

Viceroy of New Grenada

Antonio de la Pedrosa y Guerrero (born ca. 1660) was an attorney in Spain and in Santa Fe de Bogotá (now in Colombia), a member of the Council of the Indies, and the first (provisional) viceroy of New Granada, from June 13, 1718, to November 25, 1719.

== Biography ==
Pedrosa y Guerrero served in several important posts in Spain. In 1684 he became an attorney and protector of the Indians at the Audiencia of Bogotá. Thereafter he was appointed to the Council of the Indies in Spain. While he was still serving as councilor, King Philip V placed him in charge of the newly created Viceroyalty of Nuevo Reino de Granada, in 1717. Up until that year, New Granada had been governed from Lima, as part of the Viceroyalty of Peru. The new colony included the provinces of Santafé, Cartagena, Santa Marta, Maracaibo, Caracas, Antioquia, Guayana and Popayán, as well as the audiencias of Quito and Panamá. It corresponded approximately to the present-day countries of Venezuela, Colombia, Panama and Ecuador.

Pedrosa arrived in Bogotá on June 7, 1717. He received the government from the hands of Archbishop Rincón, who had been serving as interim governor, on the thirteenth. He was charged with establishing institutions for the new colony. He was also instructed to initiate reforms to improve and strengthen Spanish rule. In particular he was to address high-level political corruption and the large amount of smuggling that was being carried on. To accomplish this, he was given the authority of a viceroy, but not the title. The titles he did receive were governor and captain general of the colony and president of the Audiencia of Bogotá.

Pedrosa exposed a conspiracy involving Governor Gerónimo de Badillo and other high officials to undervalue incoming cargos for tax purposes and collect kickbacks from the merchants. They also colluded in undervaluing captured contraband. This was done with little attempt at disguise, and Pedrosa had little trouble uncovering it. He reacted quickly, firing some treasury officials and fining the other individuals involved in the conspiracy. The corruption was so deeply entrenched, however, that this had little effect. In addition, Pedrosa received little support from Spain. Many of his punishments were overturned on appeal, and many of the officials he took action against were reappointed or even promoted.

Besides combating fraud, Pedrosa increased the revenue of the colony, appointed superintendents in the provinces, ordered the elimination of vacant encomiendas, and worked on the fortifications of Cartagena.

Pedrosa served until late 1719, when the first official viceroy, Jorge de Villalonga took office. Pedrosa returned to Spain in 1720. Villalonga did nothing to combat the smuggling and corruption. Instead he joined with the other corrupt officials to profit from it.

The Viceroyalty of New Granada lasted only until 1723, when the territory was returned to the jurisdiction of Lima. It was separated again in 1740, this time permanently.

Government offices
Preceded by none	Viceroy of New Granada; 1718–1719	Succeeded by Jorge de Villalonga
