= History of South America =

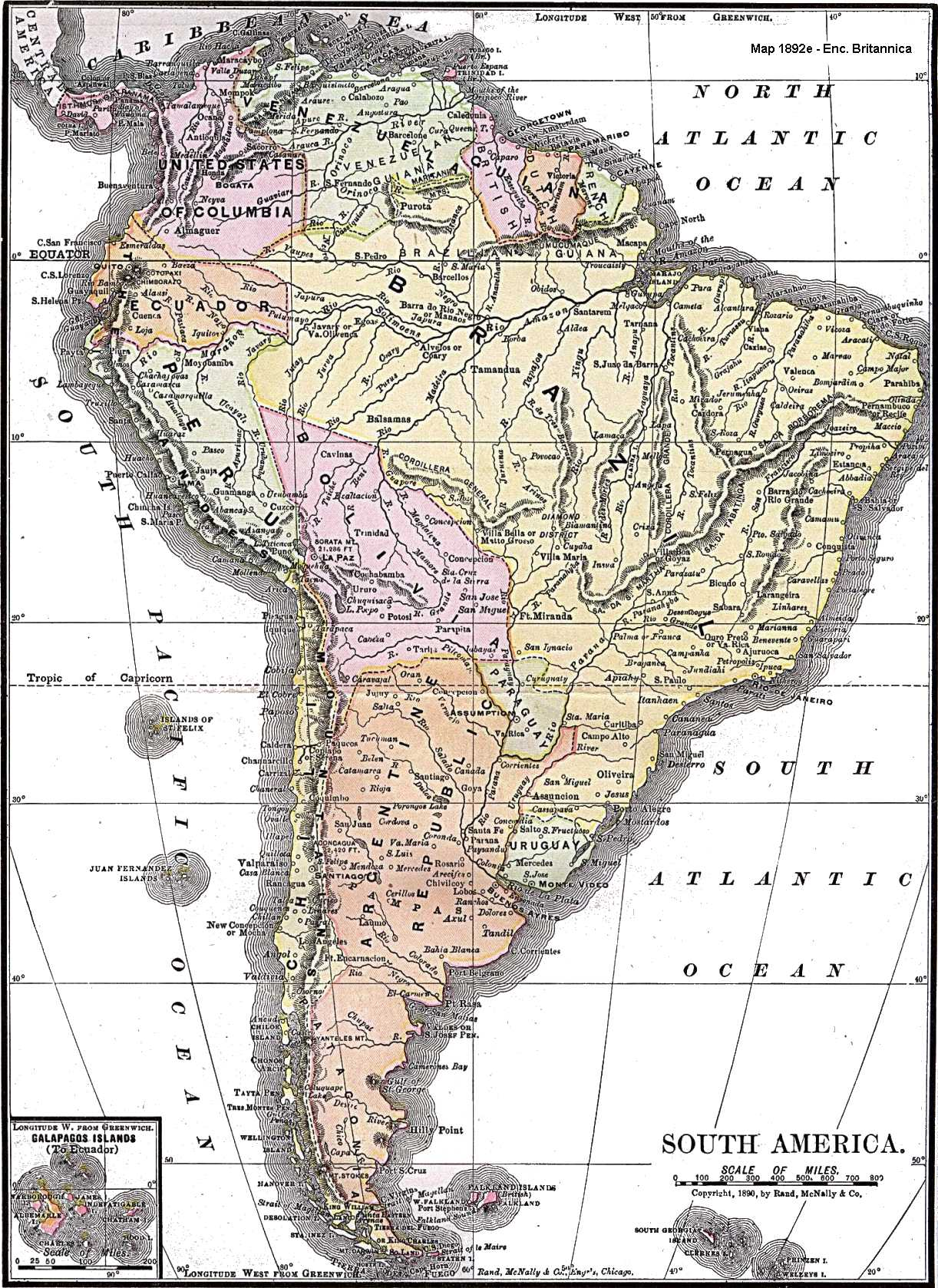
1892 map of South America

Animation showing geographic evolution of European colonies and breakaway states in South America, 1700 to present

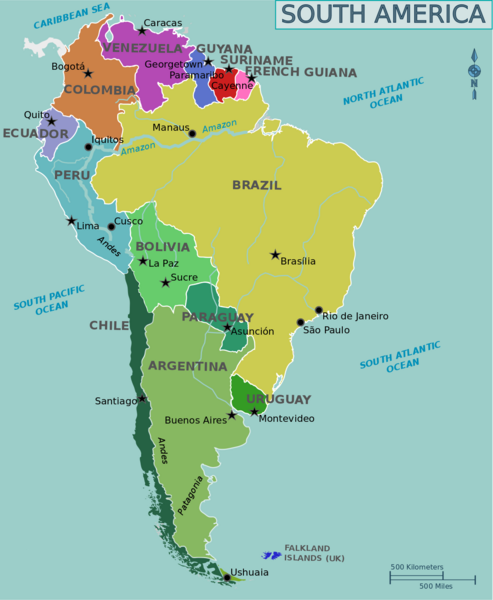
Contemporary political map of South America

The history of South America is the study of the past, particularly the written record, oral histories, and traditions, passed down from generation to generation on the continent of South America. The continent continues to be home to indigenous peoples, some of whom built high civilizations prior to the arrival of Europeans in the late 1400s and early 1500s. South America has a history that has a wide range of human cultures and forms of civilization. The Norte Chico civilization in Peru dating back to about 3500 BC is the oldest civilization in the Americas and one of the first six independent civilizations in the world; it was contemporaneous with the Egyptian pyramids. It predated the Mesoamerican Olmec by nearly two millennia.

Indigenous peoples' thousands of years of independent life were disrupted by European colonization from Spain and Portugal and by demographic collapse. The resulting civilizations, however, were very different from those of their colonizers, both in the mestizos and the indigenous cultures of the continent. Through the trans-Atlantic slave trade, South America (especially Brazil) became the home of millions of people of the African diaspora. The mixing of ethnic groups led to new social structures.

The tensions between Europeans, indigenous peoples, and African slaves and their descendants shaped South America as a whole, starting in the sixteenth century. Most of Spanish America achieved its independence in the early nineteenth century through hard-fought wars, while Portuguese Brazil first became the seat of the Portuguese empire and then an empire independent of Portugal. With the revolution for independence from the Spanish crown achieved during the 19th century, South America underwent yet more social and political changes. These have included nation building projects, absorbing waves of immigration from Europe in the late 19th and 20th centuries, dealing with increased international trade, colonization of hinterlands, and wars about territory ownership and power balance. During this period there has also been the reorganization of Indigenous rights and duties, subjugation of Indigenous peoples living in the states' frontiers, that lasted until the early 1900s; liberal-conservative conflicts among the ruling classes, and major demographic and environmental changes accompanying the development of sensitive habitats.

== Prehistory ==
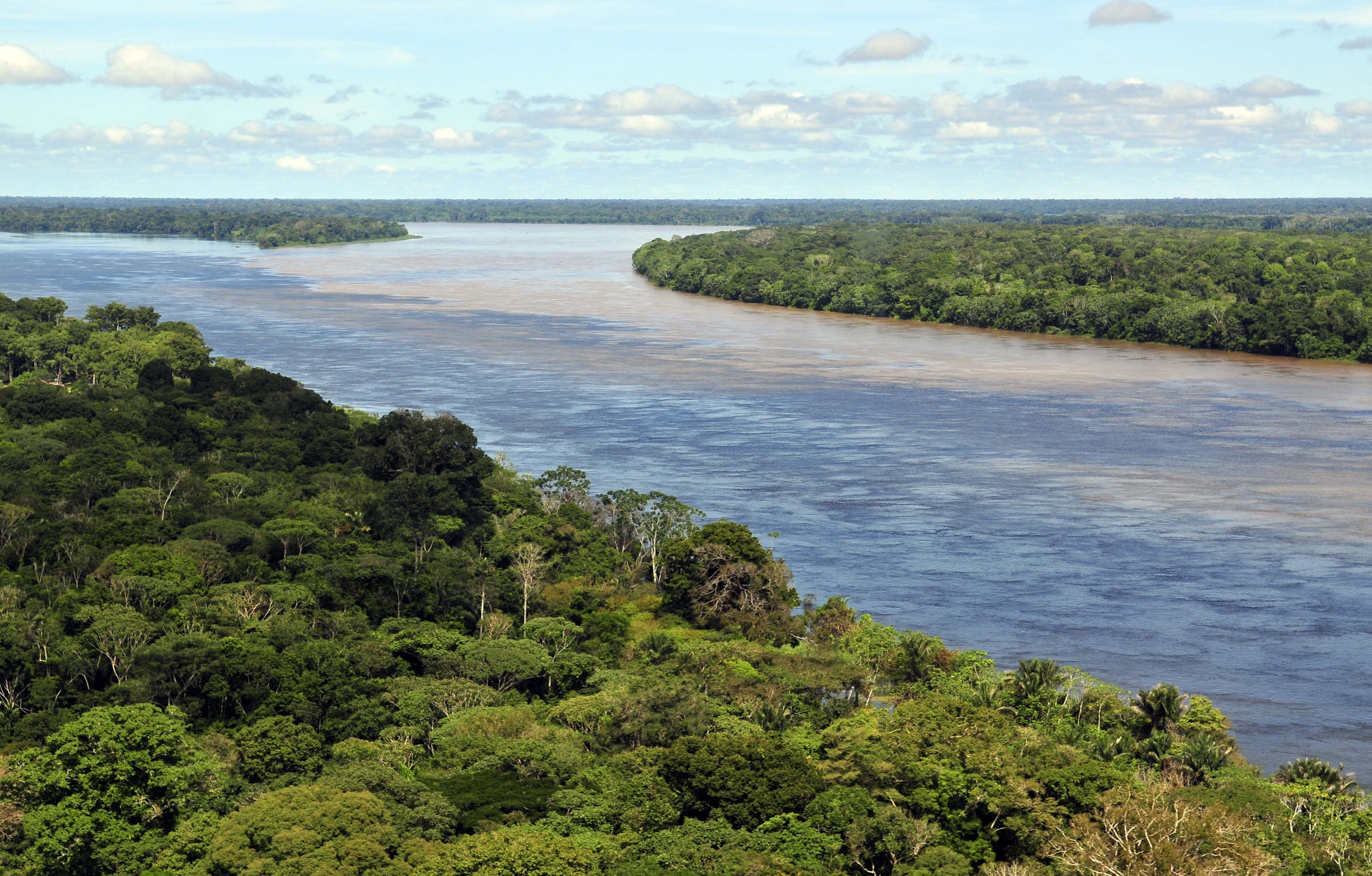
Aerial view of the Amazon rainforest, near Manaus

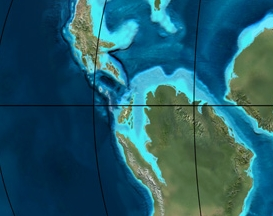
Paleogeography of northern South America around 105 mya

In the Paleozoic and Early Mesozoic eras, South America and Africa were connected in a landmass called Gondwana, as part of the supercontinent Pangaea. In the Albian, around 110 mya, South America and Africa began to diverge along the southern Mid-Atlantic Ridge, giving rise to a landmass of Antarctica and South America. During the late Eocene, around 35 mya, Antarctica and South America separated and South America became a massive, biologically rich island-continent. During approximately 30 million years, the biodiversity of South America was isolated from the rest of the world, leading to the evolution of species within the continent.

The event that caused the mass-extinction of dinosaurs 66 Mya gave rise to neotropical rainforest biomes like the Amazonia, replacing species composition and structure of local forests. During ~6 million years of recovery to former levels of plant diversity, they evolved from widely spaced gymnosperm-dominated forests to the forests with thick canopies which block sunlight, prevalent flowering plants and high vertical layering as known today.

Geological evidence suggests that approximately 3 million years ago, South America became connected to North America when the Bolivar Trough marine barrier disappeared and the Panamanian land bridge formed. The joining of these two land masses led to the Great American Interchange, in which biota from both continents expanded their ranges. The first species known to have made the northward migration was Pliometanastes, a fossil ground sloth roughly the size of a modern black bear. Migrations to the Southern Hemisphere were undertaken by several North American mammalian carnivores. Fewer species migrated in the opposite direction from south to north. The result of the expansion of a North American fauna was a mass extinction in which hundreds of species disappeared in a relatively short time. About 60% of present-day South American mammals have evolved from North American species. Some South American species were able to adapt and spread into North America. Apart from Pliometanastes, during the Irvingtonian stage of the mammal land stages, around 1.9 mya, species as Pampatherium, a giant armadillo, ground sloth Megatherium, giant anteater Myrmecophaga, a Neogene capybara (Hydrochoerus), Meizonyx, opossum Didelphis, and Mixotoxodon followed the route north. The terror bird Titanis, the only large carnivore in South America, dispersed into North America.

== Pre-Columbian era ==
=== Earliest inhabitants ===
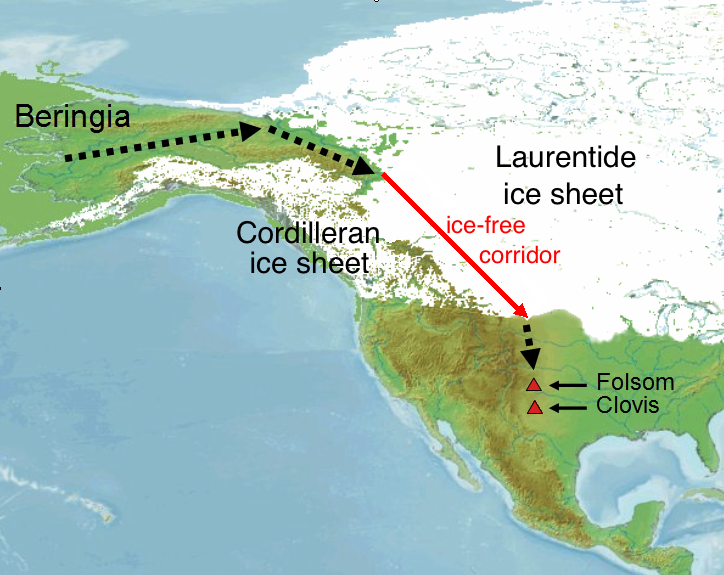
Approximate location of the ice-free corridor and specific Paleoindian sites, according to the Clovis theory

The Americas are thought to have been first inhabited by people from eastern Asia who crossed the Bering Land Bridge to present-day Alaska; the land separated and the continents are divided by the Bering Strait. Over the course of millennia, three waves of migrants spread to all parts of the Americas. Genetic and linguistic evidence has shown that the last wave of migrant peoples settled across the northern tier, and did not reach South America.

Amongst the oldest evidence for human presence in South America is the Monte Verde II site in Chile, suggested to date to around 14,500 years ago. From around 13,000 years ago, the Fishtail projectile point style became widespread across South America, with its disappearance around 11,000 years ago coincident with the disappearance of South America's megafauna as part of the Quaternary extinction event.

Genomic research indicates that the initial peopling of South America involved at least three major population dispersals rather than a single continuous migration. Ancient-DNA evidence suggests subsequent regional differentiation, population replacement in some areas, and long-term genetic continuity in others.

=== Agriculture and domestication of animals ===
The first evidence for the existence of agricultural practices in South America dates back to circa 6500 BC, when potatoes, chilies and beans began to be cultivated for food in the Amazon Basin. Pottery evidence suggests that manioc, which remains a staple food supply today, was being cultivated as early as 2000 BC.

South American cultures began domesticating llamas and alpacas in the highlands of the Andes circa 3500 BC. These animals were used for both transportation and meat; their fur was shorn or collected to use to make clothing. Guinea pigs were also domesticated as a food source at this time.

By 2000 BC, many agrarian village communities had developed throughout the Andes and the surrounding regions. Fishing became a widespread practice along the coast, with fish being the primary source of food for those communities. Irrigation systems were also developed at this time, which aided in the rise of agrarian societies. The food crops were quinoa, corn, lima beans, common beans, peanuts, manioc, sweet potatoes, potatoes, oca and squashes. Cotton was also grown and was particularly important as the only major fiber crop.

Among the earliest permanent settlements, dated to 4700 BC is the Huaca Prieta site on the coast of Peru, and at 3500 BC the Valdivia culture in Ecuador. Other groups also formed permanent settlements. Among those groups were the Muisca or "Muysca," and the Tairona, located in present-day Colombia. The Cañari of Ecuador, Quechua of Peru, and Aymara of Bolivia were the three most important Native peoples who developed societies of sedentary agriculture in South America.

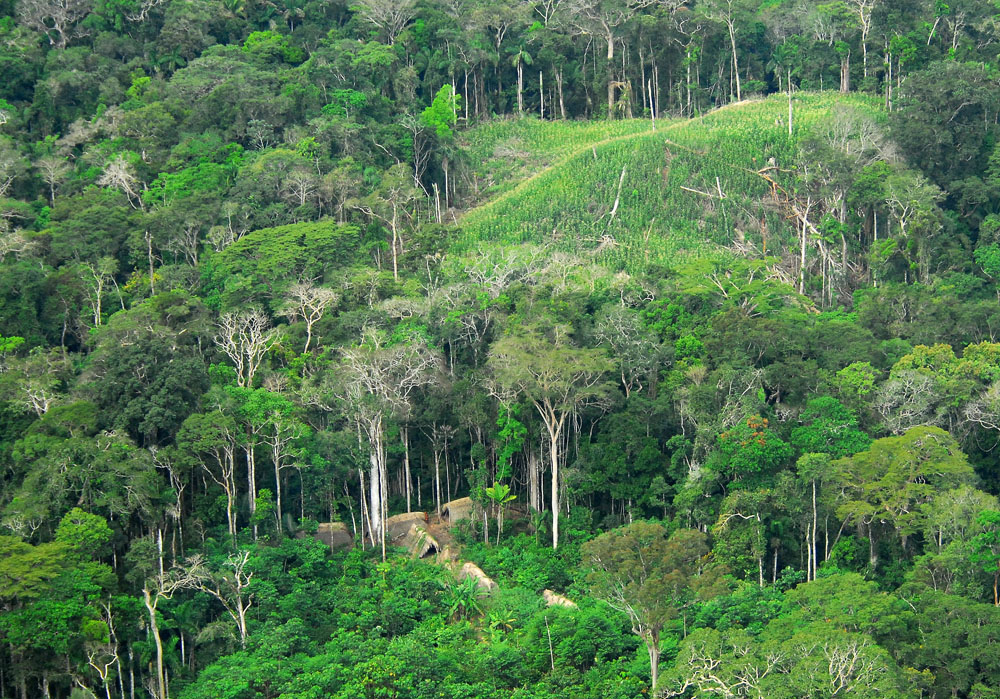
Members of an uncontacted tribe encountered in the Brazilian state of Acre in 2009

In the last two thousand years, there may have been contact with the Polynesians who sailed to and from the continent across the South Pacific Ocean. The sweet potato, which originated in South America, spread through some areas of the Pacific. There is no genetic legacy of human contact.

==== Caral-Supe / Norte Chico ====
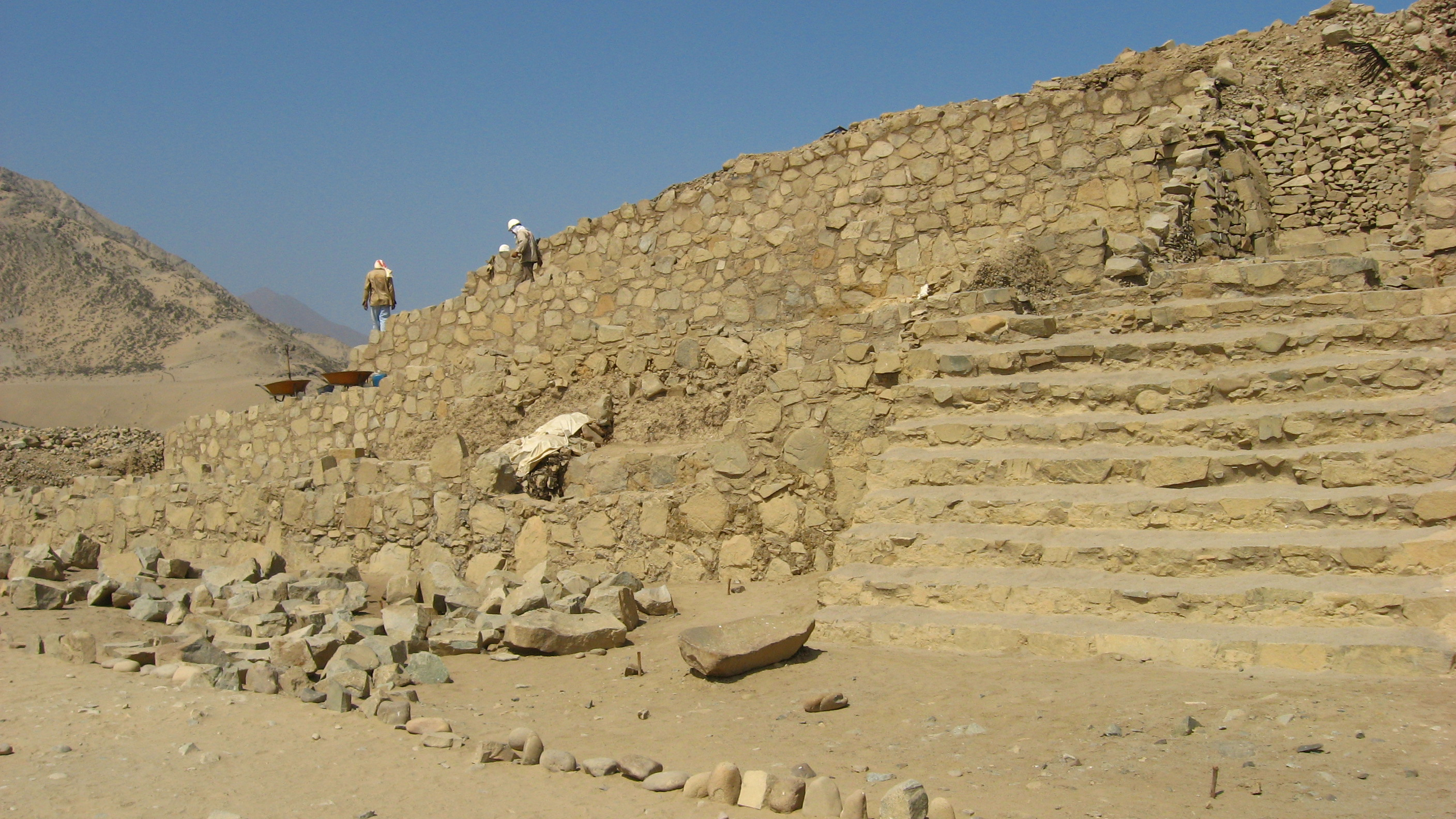
Caral

On the north-western coast of present-day Peru, the Caral-Supe civilization, also known as the Norte Chico civilization emerged as one of six civilizations to develop independently in the world. It was roughly contemporaneous with the Egyptian pyramids. It preceded the civilization of Mesoamerica by two millennia. It is believed to have been the only civilization dependent on fishing rather than agriculture to support its population.

The Caral Supe complex is one of the larger Norte Chico sites and has been dated to 27th century BC. It is noteworthy for having absolutely no signs of warfare. It was contemporary with urbanism's rise in Mesopotamia.

=== Cañari ===
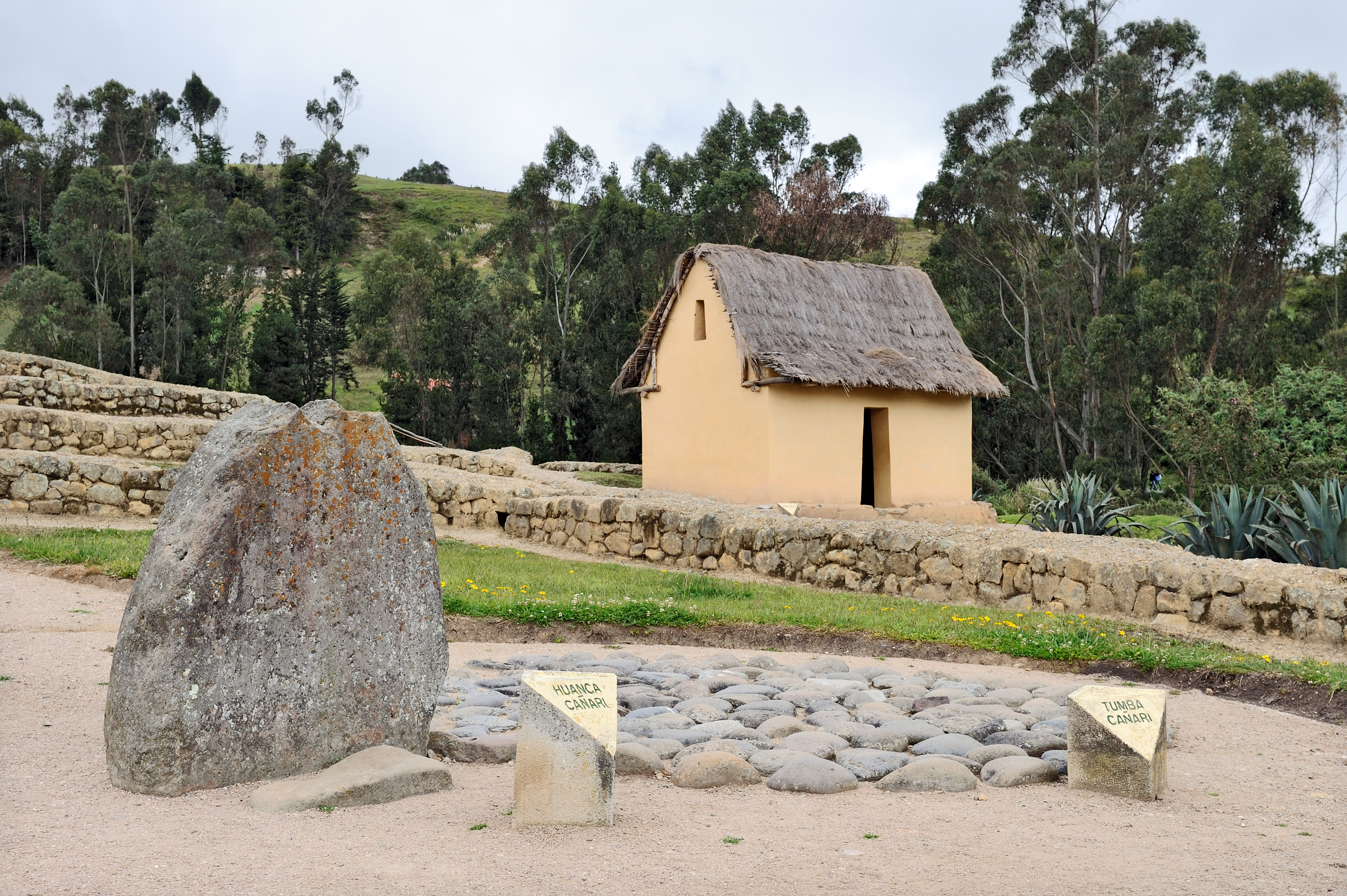
Ingapirca, Ecuador, Caħari ruins: astronomical stone (left), tomb (right) and reconstructed house (background)

The Cañari were the indigenous natives of today's Ecuadorian provinces of Cañar and Azuay at the time of European contact. They were an elaborate civilization with advanced architecture and religious belief. Most of their remains were either burned or destroyed from attacks by the Inca and later the Spaniards. Their old city "Guapondelig", was replaced twice, first by the Incan city of Tomipamba, and later by the colonial city of Cuenca. The city was believed by the Spanish to be the site of El Dorado, the city of gold from the mythology of Colombia.

The Cañari were most notable in having repulsed the Incan invasion with fierce resistance for many years until they fell to Tupac Yupanqui. It is said that the Inca strategically married the Cañari princess Paccha to conquer the people. Many of their descendants still reside in Cañar.

=== Chibchan Nations ===
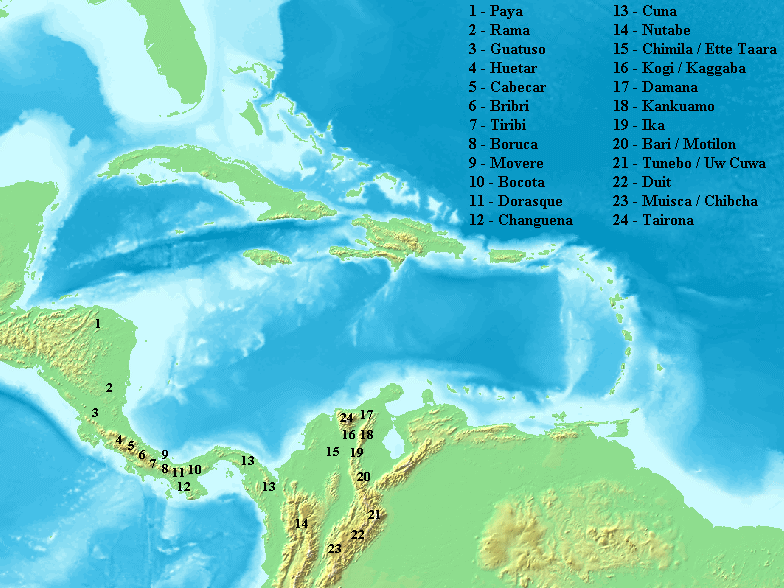
Distribution of Chibchan languages in southern Central America and northwestern South America, present-day Colombia

The Chibcha-speaking communities were the most numerous, the most extended by territory, and the most socio-economically developed of the Pre-Hispanic Colombian cultures. They were divided into two linguistic subgroups; the Arwako-Chimila languages, with the Tairona, Kankuamo, Kogi, Arhuaco, Chimila and Chitarero people and the Guna-Colombian languages with Guna, Nutabe, Motilon, U'wa, Lache, Guane, Sutagao and Muisca.

==== Muisca ====
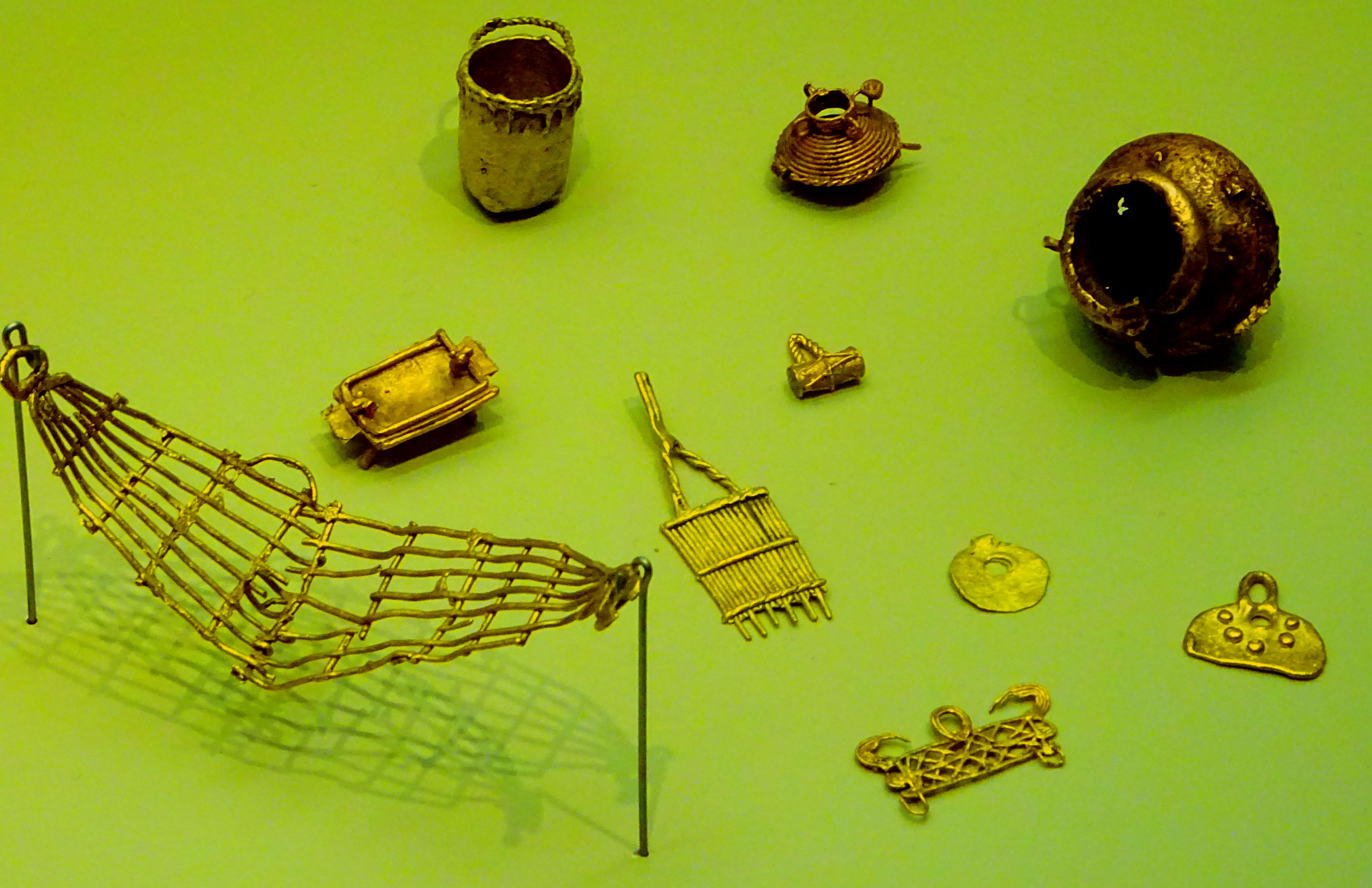
The fine goldworking of the Muisca formed the basis for the expedition from the Caribbean coast into the heart of the Andes, where they developed an advanced civilisation based on agriculture, salt production and trade

Of these indigenous groups, the Muisca were the most advanced and formed one of the four grand civilisations in the Americas. With the Inca in Peru, they constituted the two developed and specialised societies of South America. The Muisca, meaning "people" or "person" in their version of the Chibcha language; Muysccubun, inhabited the Altiplano Cundiboyacense, the high plateau in the Eastern Ranges of the Colombian Andes and surrounding valleys, such as the Tenza Valley. Commonly set at 800 AD, their history succeeded the Herrera Period. The people were organised in a loose confederation of rulers, later called the Muisca Confederation. At the time of the Spanish conquest, their reign spread across the modern departments Cundinamarca and Boyacá with small parts of southern Santander with a surface area of approximately 25,000 square kilometres (9,700 sq mi) and a total population of between 300,000 and two million individuals.

The Muisca were known as "The Salt People", thanks to their extraction of and trade in halite from brines in various salt mines of which those in Zipaquirá and Nemocón are still the most important. This extraction process was the work of the Muisca women exclusively and formed the backbone of their highly regarded trading with other Chibcha-, Arawak- and Cariban-speaking neighboring indigenous groups. Trading was performed using salt, small cotton cloths and larger mantles and ceramics as barter trade. Their economy was agricultural in nature, profiting from the fertile soils of the Pleistocene Lake Humboldt that existed on the Bogotá savanna until around 30,000 years BP. Their crops were cultivated using irrigation and drainage on elevated terraces and mounds. To the Spanish conquistadors they were best known for their advanced gold-working, as represented in the tunjos (votive offer pieces), spread in museum collections all around the world. The famous Muisca raft, centerpiece in the collection of the Museo del Oro in the Colombian capital Bogotá, shows the skilled goldworking of the inhabitants of the Altiplano. The Muisca were the only pre-Columbian civilization known in South America to have used coins (tejuelos).

The gold and tumbaga (a gold-silver-copper alloy elaborated by the Muisca) created the legend of El Dorado; the "land, city or man of gold". The Spanish conquistadors who landed in the Caribbean city of Santa Marta were informed of the rich gold culture and led by Gonzalo Jiménez de Quesada and his brother Hernán Pérez, organised the most strenuous of the Spanish conquests into the heart of the Andes in April 1536. After an expedition of a year, where 80% of the soldiers died due to the harsh climate, carnivores such as caimans and jaguars and the frequent attacks of the indigenous peoples found along the route, Tisquesusa, the zipa of Bacatá, on the Bogotá savanna, was beaten by the Spanish on 20 April 1537, and died "bathing in his own blood", as prophesied by the mohan Popón.

=== The Amazon ===
Approximately 9,000 years ago, new migrants largely replaced the earlier populations associated with the Clovis culture across the entire continent, including the Amazon. Around 3,000 years ago, speakers of Arawakan languages spread along river systems from western and central Amazonia into northern South America and the Caribbean. Around the same time, Tupian-speaking peoples began expanding from southwestern Amazonia, with speakers of the Tupi–Guarani languages later spreading to other parts of South America. In southern Brazil, the expansion of Tupi-Guarani groups displaced or confined earlier inhabitants, including speakers of Macro-Jê languages, from many river valleys and parts of the Atlantic coast toward the interior. Between the 4th and 10th centuries AD, groups of Carib-speaking peoples also spread from northern Amazonia and the Orinoco region to Guyana and to the middle and lower Amazon.

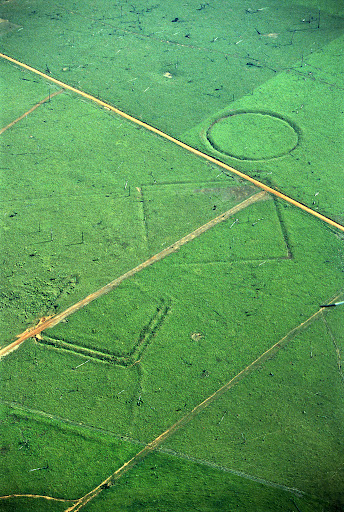
Geoglyphs on deforested land in the Amazon rainforest

For a long time, scholars believed that Amazon forests were occupied by small numbers of hunter-gatherer tribes. Archeologist Betty J. Meggers was a prominent proponent of this idea, as described in her book Amazonia: Man and Culture in a Counterfeit Paradise. However, recent archeological findings have suggested that the region was densely populated. From the 1970s, numerous geoglyphs have been discovered on deforested land dating between 0–1250 AD. Additional finds have led to conclusions that there were highly developed and populous cultures in the forests, organized as Pre-Columbian civilizations. The BBC's Unnatural Histories claimed that the Amazon rainforest, rather than being a pristine wilderness, has been shaped by man for at least 11,000 years through practices such as forest gardening. The discovery of the Upano Valley sites in present-day eastern Ecuador predate all known complex Amazonian societies.

The first European to travel the length of the Amazon River was Francisco de Orellana in 1542. The BBC documentary Unnatural Histories presents evidence that Francisco de Orellana, rather than exaggerating his claims as previously thought, was correct in his observations that an advanced civilization was flourishing along the Amazon in the 1540s. It is believed that the civilization was later devastated by the spread of infectious diseases from Europe, such as smallpox, to which the natives had no immunity. Some 5 million people may have lived in the Amazon region in 1500, divided between dense coastal settlements, such as that at Marajó, and inland dwellers. By 1900 the population had fallen to 1 million, and by the early 1980s, it was less than 200,000.

Researchers have found that the fertile terra preta (black earth) is distributed over large areas in the Amazon forest. It is now widely accepted that these soils are a product of indigenous soil management. The development of this soil enabled agriculture and silviculture to be conducted in the previously hostile environment. Large portions of the Amazon rainforest are therefore probably the result of centuries of human management, rather than naturally occurring as has previously been supposed. In the region of the Xinguanos tribe, remains of some of these large, mid-forest Amazon settlements were found in 2003 by Michael Heckenberger and colleagues of the University of Florida. Among those remains were evidence of constructed roads, bridges and large plazas.

=== Andean civilizations ===
==== Chavín ====
Overview map of the world in 500 BC, showing Chavín, Paracas, Chorrera and their neighbors

The Chavín, a South American preliterate civilization, established a trade network and developed agriculture by 900 BC, according to some estimates and archeological finds. Artifacts were found at a site called Chavín de Huantar in modern Peru at an elevation of 3,177 meters. Chavín civilization spanned 900 to 200 BC.

==== Moche ====
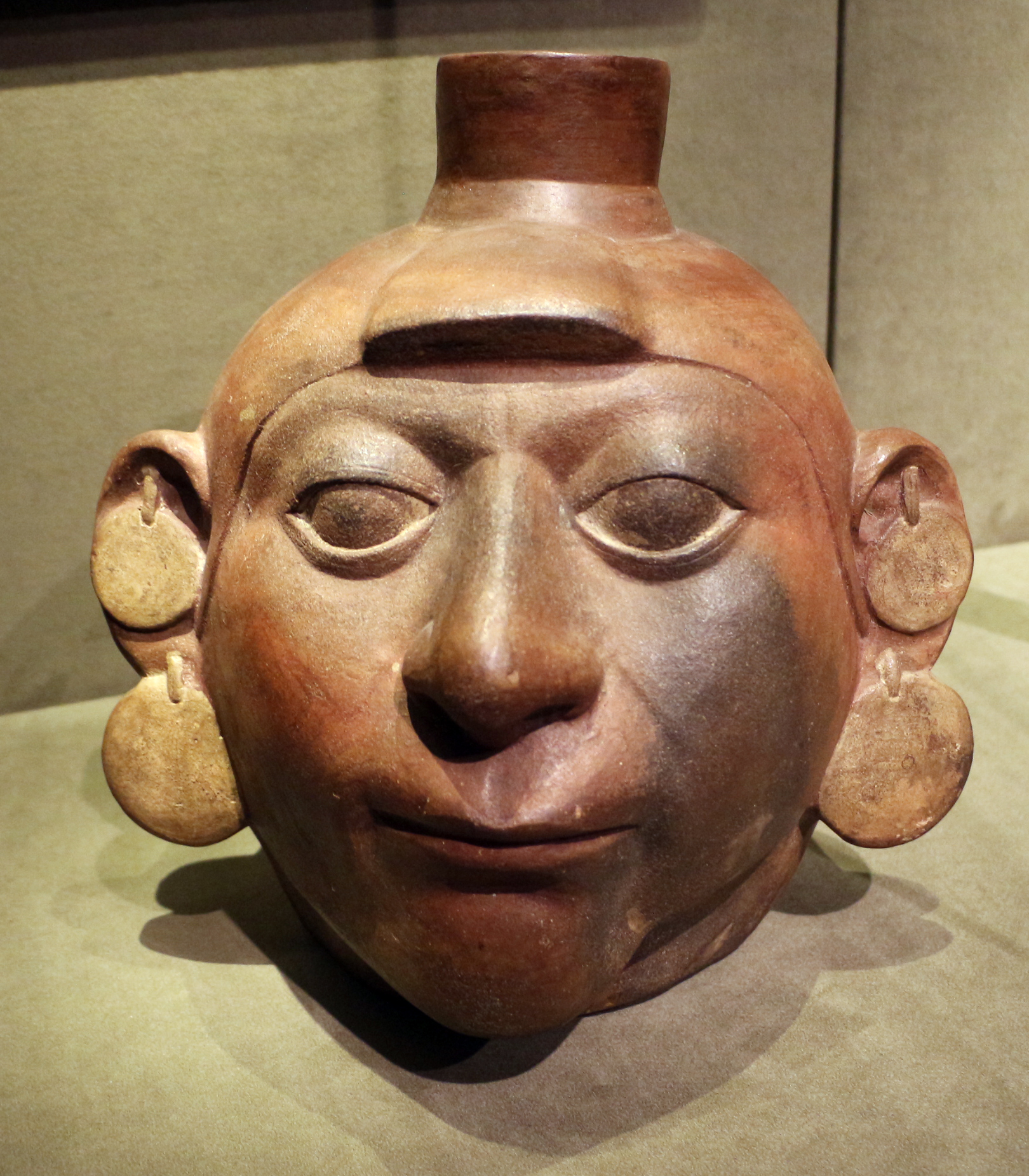
Moche portrait vessel, c. 200—850 AD

The Moche thrived on the north coast of Peru between the first and ninth century AD. The heritage of the Moche comes down to us through their elaborate burials, excavated by former UCLA professor Christopher B. Donnan in association with the National Geographic Society.

Skilled artisans, the Moche were a technologically advanced people who traded with faraway peoples, like the Maya. Knowledge about the Moche has been derived mostly from their ceramic pottery, which is carved with representations of their daily lives. They practiced human sacrifice, had blood-drinking rituals, and their religion incorporated non-procreative sexual practices (such as fellatio).

==== Inca ====
Holding their capital at the great puma-shaped city of Cuzco, the Inca civilization dominated the Andes region from 1438 to 1533. Known as Tawantin suyu, or "the land of the four regions," in Quechua, the Inca civilization was highly distinct and developed. Inca rule extended to nearly a hundred linguistic or ethnic communities, some 9 to 14 million people connected by a 25,000-kilometre road system. Cities were built with precise, unmatched stonework, constructed over many levels of mountain terrain. Terrace farming was a useful form of agriculture. There is evidence of excellent metalwork and successful skull surgery in Inca civilization. The Inca had no written language, but used quipu, a system of knotted strings, to record information. Ongoing Kiphu research suggests that the Inca used a phonetic system as a form of writing in the kiphu. Francisco Pizarro led the Spanish Conquest, which eventually led to the fall of the Incan Empire through the spread of disease and internal strife.

=== Arawak and Carib civilizations ===
The initial settlement of the Caribbean began during the Archaic Age with pre-ceramic hunter-gatherer populations, who had spread across parts of the region by approximately 5,000 years ago. Beginning around 2800 years ago, Ceramic Age populations migrating from northern South America introduced agriculture and pottery, and their expansion was associated with substantial demographic turnover that shaped subsequent Caribbean populations, including those ancestral to the Taíno.

The Arawak lived along the eastern coast of South America, from present-day Guyana to as far south as what is now Brazil. Explorer Christopher Columbus described them at first encounter as a peaceful people, having already dominated other local groups such as the Ciboney. The Arawak had, however, come under increasing military pressure from the Carib, who are believed to have left the Orinoco river area to settle on islands and the coast of the Caribbean Sea. Over the century leading up to Columbus' arrival in the Caribbean archipelago in 1492, the Carib are believed to have displaced many of the Arawak who previously settled the island chains. The Carib also encroached on Arawak territory in what is modern Guyana.

The Carib were skilled boatbuilders and sailors who owed their dominance in the Caribbean basin to their military skills. The Carib war rituals included cannibalism; they had a practice of taking home the limbs of victims as trophies.

It is not known how many indigenous peoples lived in Venezuela and Colombia before the Spanish Conquest; it may have been approximately one million, including groups such as the Auaké, Caquetio, Mariche, and Timoto-cuicas. The number of people fell dramatically after the Conquest, mainly due to high mortality rates in epidemics of infectious Eurasian diseases introduced by the explorers, who carried them as an endemic disease. There were two main north–south axes of pre-Columbian population; producing maize in the west and manioc in the east. Large parts of the llanos plains were cultivated through a combination of slash and burn and permanent settled agriculture.

== European colonization ==
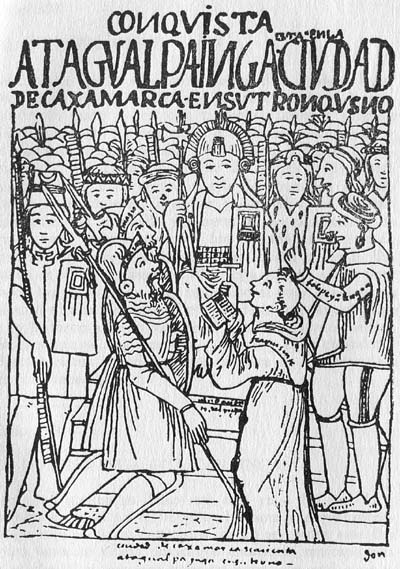
Spanish conquistador Francisco Pizarro meets with the Inca emperor Atahualpa, 1532

Before the arrival of Europeans 20–30 million people lived in South America.

Between 1452 and 1493, a series of papal bulls (Dum Diversas, Romanus Pontifex, and Inter caetera) paved the way for the European colonization and Catholic missions in the New World. These authorized the European Christian nations to "take possession" of non-Christian lands and encouraged subduing and converting the non-Christian people of Africa and the Americas.

In 1494, Portugal and Spain, the two great maritime powers of that time, signed the Treaty of Tordesillas in the expectation of new lands being discovered in the west. Through the treaty, they agreed that all the land outside Europe should be an exclusive duopoly between the two countries. The treaty established an imaginary line along a north–south meridian 370 leagues west of Cape Verde Islands, roughly 46° 37' W. In terms of the treaty, all land to the west of the line (which is now known to include most of the South American soil), would belong to Spain, and all land to the east, to Portugal. Because accurate measurements of longitude were not possible at that time, the line was not strictly enforced, resulting in a Portuguese expansion of Brazil across the meridian.

In 1498, during his third voyage to the Americas, Christopher Columbus sailed near the Orinoco Delta and then landed in the Gulf of Paria (in what is now Venezuela). Amazed by the great offshore current of freshwater which deflected his course eastward, Columbus stated in his letter to Isabella I and Ferdinand II that he must have reached heaven on Earth (terrestrial paradise):

Great signs are these of the Terrestrial Paradise, for the site conforms to the opinion of the holy and wise theologians whom I have mentioned. And likewise, the [other] signs conform very well, for I have never read or heard of such a large quantity of fresh water being inside and in such close proximity to salt water; the very mild temperateness also corroborates this; and if the water of which I speak does not proceed from Paradise then it is an even greater marvel, because I do not believe such a large and deep river has ever been known to exist in this world.

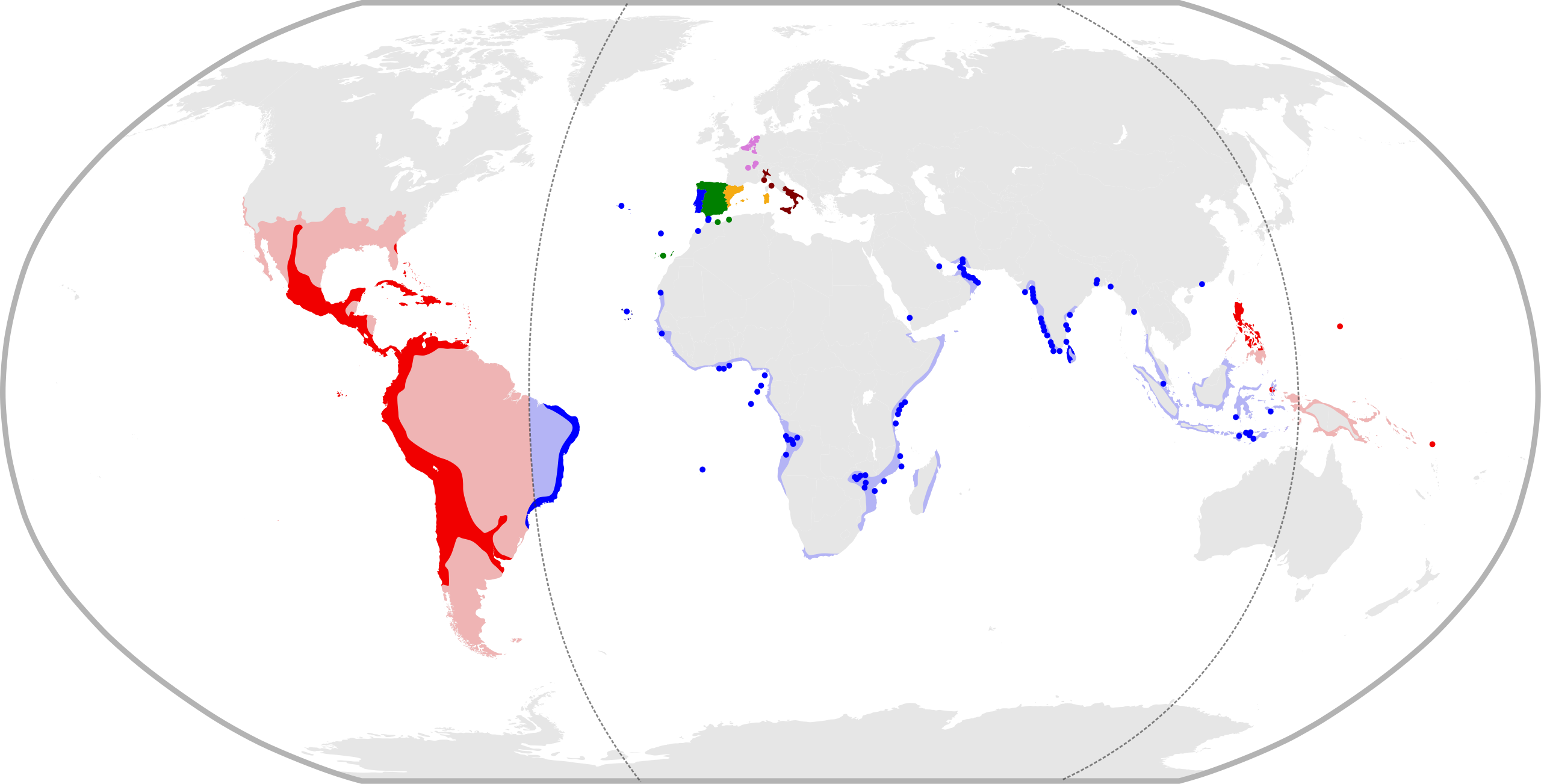
The Iberian Union in 1598, under Philip II, King of Spain and Portugal

Beginning in 1499, the people and natural resources of South America were repeatedly exploited by foreign conquistadors, first from Spain and later from Portugal. These competing colonial nations claimed the land and resources as their own and divided it into colonies.

European diseases (smallpox, influenza, measles and typhus) to which the native populations had no resistance were the overwhelming cause of the depopulation of the Native American population. Systems of forced labor (such as encomiendas and mining industries mita) under Spanish control also contributed to depopulation. Lower bound estimates speak of a decline in the population of around 20–50 percent, whereas the highest estimates reach 90 percent. Following this, enslaved Africans, who had developed immunity to these diseases, were quickly brought in to replace them.

The Spaniards were committed to converting their American subjects to Christianity and were quick to purge any native cultural practices that hindered this end. However, most initial attempts at this were only partially successful; American groups simply blended Catholicism with their traditional beliefs. The Spaniards did not impose their language to the degree they did their religion. In fact, the missionary work of the Roman Catholic Church in Quechua, Nahuatl, and Guarani actually contributed to the expansion of these American languages, equipping them with writing systems.

Eventually, the natives and the Spaniards intermixed, forming a Mestizo class. Mestizos and the Native Americans were often forced to pay unfair taxes to the Spanish government (although all subjects paid taxes) and were punished harshly for disobeying their laws. Many native artworks were considered pagan idols and destroyed by Spanish explorers. This included a great number of gold and silver sculptures, which were melted down before transport to Europe.

== 17th and 18th centuries ==
Nicolaes Visscher's map of the 1630 siege of Olinda and Recife. During the Dutch–Portuguese War, the Dutch sacked and destroyed Olinda, then the richest city in colonial Brazil, and made Recife the capital of New Holland.

In 1616, the Dutch, attracted by the legend of El Dorado, founded a fort in Guayana and established three colonies:

In 1624 France attempted to settle in the area of modern-day French Guiana, but was forced to abandon it in the face of hostility from the Portuguese, who viewed it as a violation of the Treaty of Tordesillas. However French settlers returned in 1630 and in 1643 managed to establish a settlement at Cayenne along with some small-scale plantations.

Since the sixteenth century, there were some movements of discontent to the Spanish and Portuguese colonial system. Among these movements, the most famous being that of the Maroons, slaves who escaped their masters and in the shelter of the forest communities organized free communities. Attempts to subject them by the royal army were unsuccessful because the Maroons had learned to master the South American jungles. In a royal decree of 1713, the king gave legality to the first free population of the continent: Palenque de San Basilio in Colombia today, led by Benkos Bioho. Brazil saw the formation of a genuine African kingdom on their soil, with the Quilombo of Palmares.

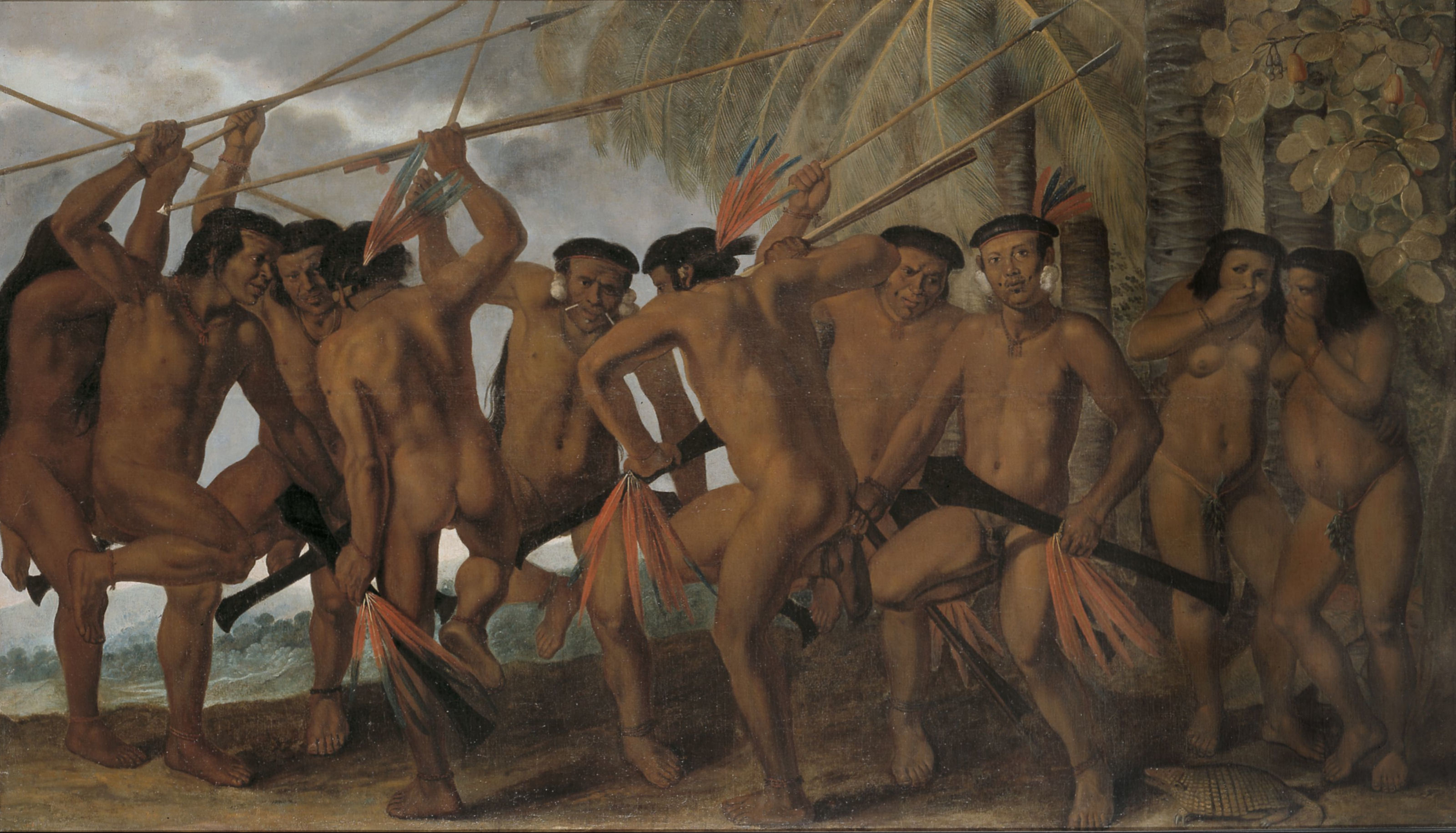
A 17th-century painting by Dutch artist Albert Eckhout depicting dancing Tapuia people in Brazil

Between 1721 and 1735, the Revolt of the Comuneros of Paraguay arose, because of clashes between the Paraguayan settlers and the Jesuits, who ran the large and prosperous Jesuit Reductions and controlled a large number of Christianized Natives.

Between 1742 and 1756, was the insurrection of Juan Santos Atahualpa in the central jungle of Peru. In 1780, the Viceroyalty of Peru was met with the insurrection of curaca Joseph Gabriel Condorcanqui or Tupac Amaru II, which would be continued by Tupac Katari in Upper Peru.

In 1763, the African Coffy led a revolt in Guyana which was bloodily suppressed by the Dutch. In 1781, the Revolt of the Comuneros (New Granada), an insurrection of the villagers in the Viceroyalty of New Granada, was a popular revolution that united indigenous people and mestizos. The villagers tried to force concessions from the colonial power and despite an agreement (capitulation) was signed, the Viceroy Manuel Antonio Flórez did not comply, and instead had the main leader José Antonio Galán executed.

In 1796, the Dutch colony of Essequibo was captured by the British during the French Revolutionary Wars.

During the eighteenth century, the priest, mathematician and botanist José Celestino Mutis (1732–1808) was delegated by the Viceroy Antonio Caballero y Gongora to conduct an inventory of the nature of the Nueva Granada, which became known as the Royal Botanical Expedition. It classified plants and wildlife.

On 15 August 1801, the Prussian scientist Alexander von Humboldt reached Fontibón where Mutis had begun his expedition to New Granada, Quito. The meeting between the two scholars is considered the brightest spot of the botanical expedition. Humboldt also visited Venezuela, Mexico, United States, Chile, and Peru. Through his observations of temperature differences between the Pacific Ocean between Chile and Peru in different periods of the year, he discovered cold currents moving from south to north up the coast of Peru, which was named the Humboldt Current in his honor.

Between 1806 and 1807, British military forces tried to invade the area of the Rio de la Plata, at the command of Home Riggs Popham and William Carr Beresford, and John Whitelocke. The invasions were repelled, but powerfully affected the Spanish authority.

== Independence and 19th century ==
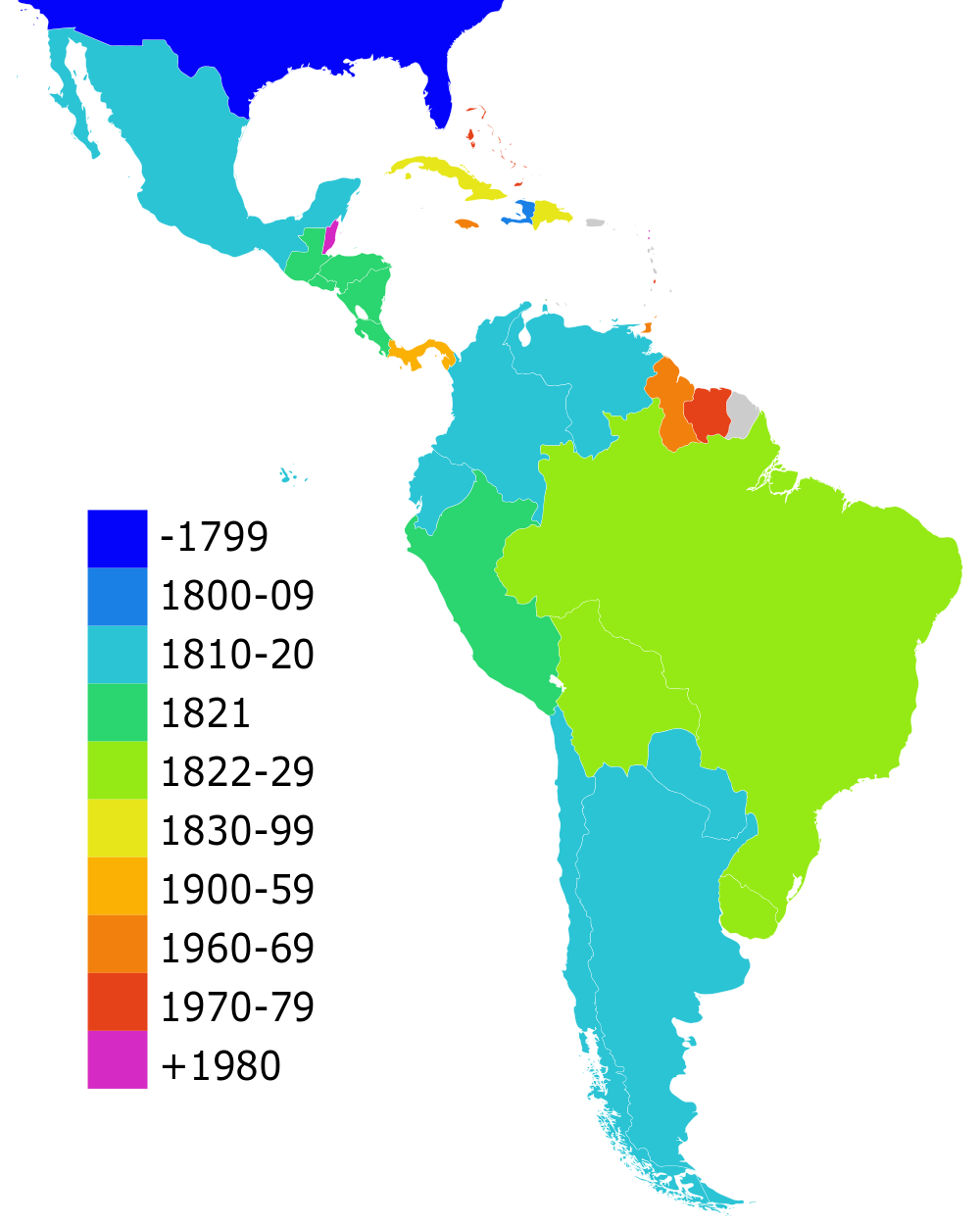
Countries in the Americas by date of independence

The Spanish colonies won their independence in the first quarter of the 19th century, in the Spanish American wars of independence. Simón Bolívar (Greater Colombia, Peru, Bolivia), José de San Martín (United Provinces of the River Plate, Chile, and Peru), and Bernardo O'Higgins (Chile) led their independence struggle. Although Bolivar attempted to keep the Spanish-speaking parts of the continent politically unified, they rapidly became independent of one another.

Unlike the Spanish colonies, the Brazilian independence came as an indirect consequence of the Napoleonic Invasions to Portugal – French invasion under General Junot led to the capture of Lisbon on 8 December 1807. In order not to lose its sovereignty, the Portuguese Court moved the capital from Lisbon to Rio de Janeiro, which was the Portuguese Empire's capital between 1808 and 1821 and rose the relevance of Brazil within the Portuguese Empire's framework. Following the Portuguese Liberal Revolution of 1820, and after several battles and skirmishes were fought in Pará and in Bahia, the heir apparent Pedro, son of King John VI of Portugal, proclaimed the country's independence in 1822 and became Brazil's first emperor (He later also reigned as Pedro IV of Portugal). This was one of the most peaceful colonial independences ever seen in human history.

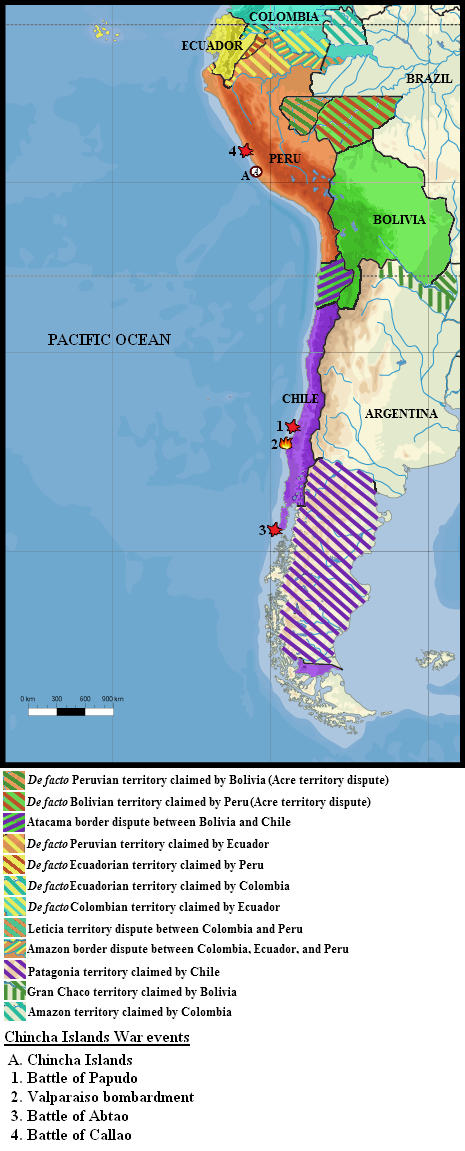
Territorial disputes in South America in the 19th century

A struggle for power emerged among the new nations, and several further wars were soon fought thereafter.

The first few wars were fought for supremacy in the northern and southern parts of the continent. The Gran Colombia – Peru War of the north and the Cisplatine War (between the Empire of Brazil and the United Provinces of the River Plate) ended in stalemate, although the latter resulted in the independence of Uruguay (1828). A few years later, after the break-up of Gran Colombia in 1831, the balance of power shifted in favor of the newly formed Peru-Bolivian Confederation (1836–39). Nonetheless, this power structure proved temporary and shifted once more as a result of the Northern Peruvian State's victory over the Southern Peruvian State-Bolivia War of the Confederation (1836–1839), and the Argentine Confederation's defeat in the Guerra Grande (1839–1852).

Later conflicts between the South American nations continued to define their borders and power status. In the Pacific coast, Chile and Peru continued to exhibit their increasing domination, defeating Spain in the Chincha Islands War. Finally, after precariously defeating Peru during the War of the Pacific (1879–1883), Chile emerged as the dominant power of the Pacific Coast of South America. In the Atlantic side, Paraguay attempted to gain a more dominant status in the region, but an alliance of Argentina, Brazil, and Uruguay (in the resulting 1864–1870 War of the Triple Alliance) ended Paraguayan ambitions. Thereupon, the Southern Cone nations of Argentina, Brazil, and Chile entered the 20th century as the major continental powers.

A few countries did not gain independence until the 20th century:

- Panama, from Colombia, in 1903
- Trinidad and Tobago, from the United Kingdom, in 1962
- Guyana, from the United Kingdom, in 1966
- Suriname, from the Netherlands, in 1975

French Guiana remains an overseas department of France.

== 20th century ==
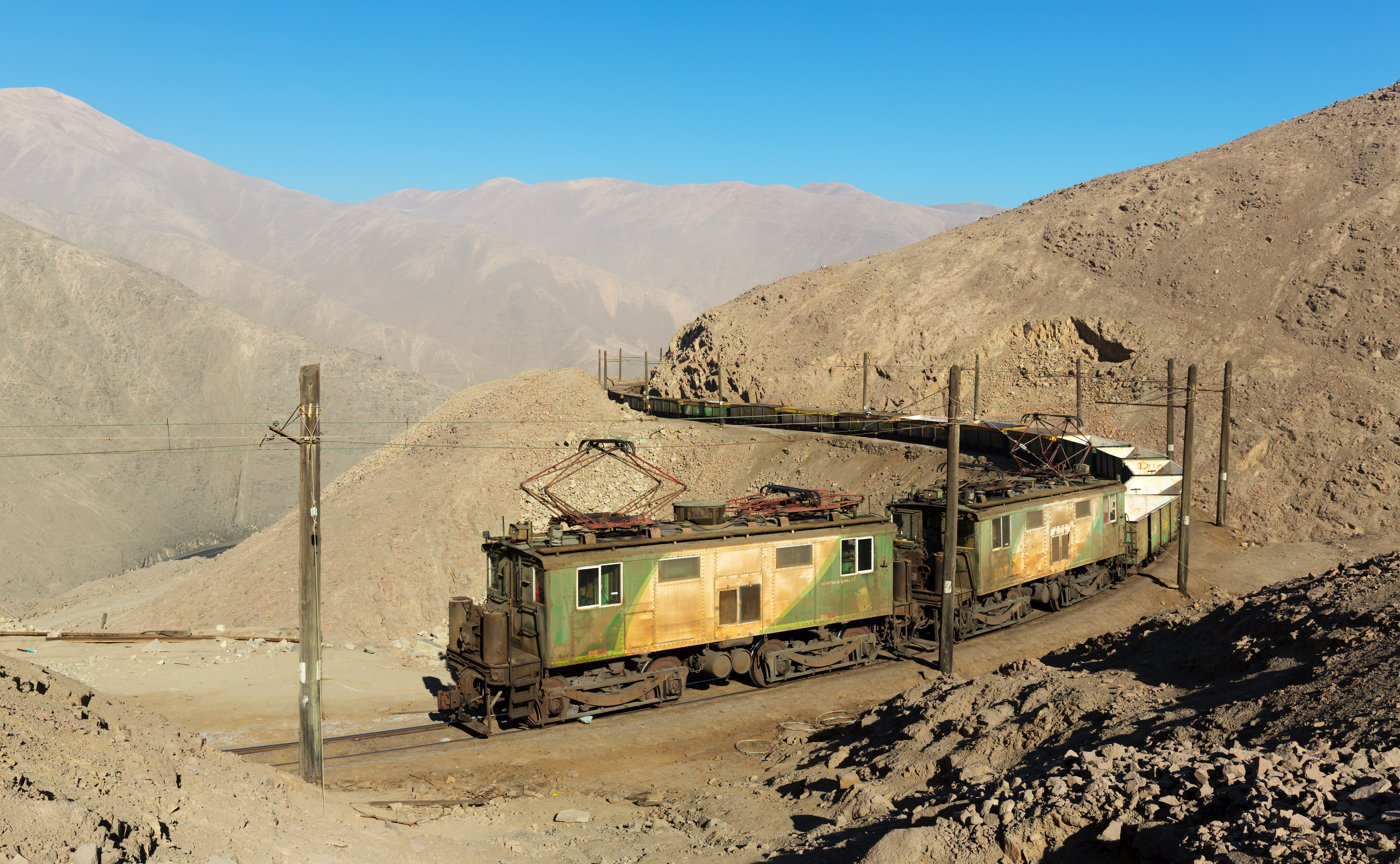
SQM GE 289A "Boxcabs" 603 and 607 hauling empty nitrate hoppers from Tocopilla to Barriles, Chile.

=== 1900–1920 ===
By the start of the century, the United States continued its interventionist attitude, which aimed to directly defend its interests in the region. This was officially articulated in Theodore Roosevelt's Big Stick Doctrine, which modified the old Monroe Doctrine, which had simply aimed to deter European intervention in the hemisphere.

=== 1930–1960 ===
The Great Depression posed a challenge to the region. The collapse of the world economy meant that the demand for raw materials drastically declined, undermining many of the economies of South America.

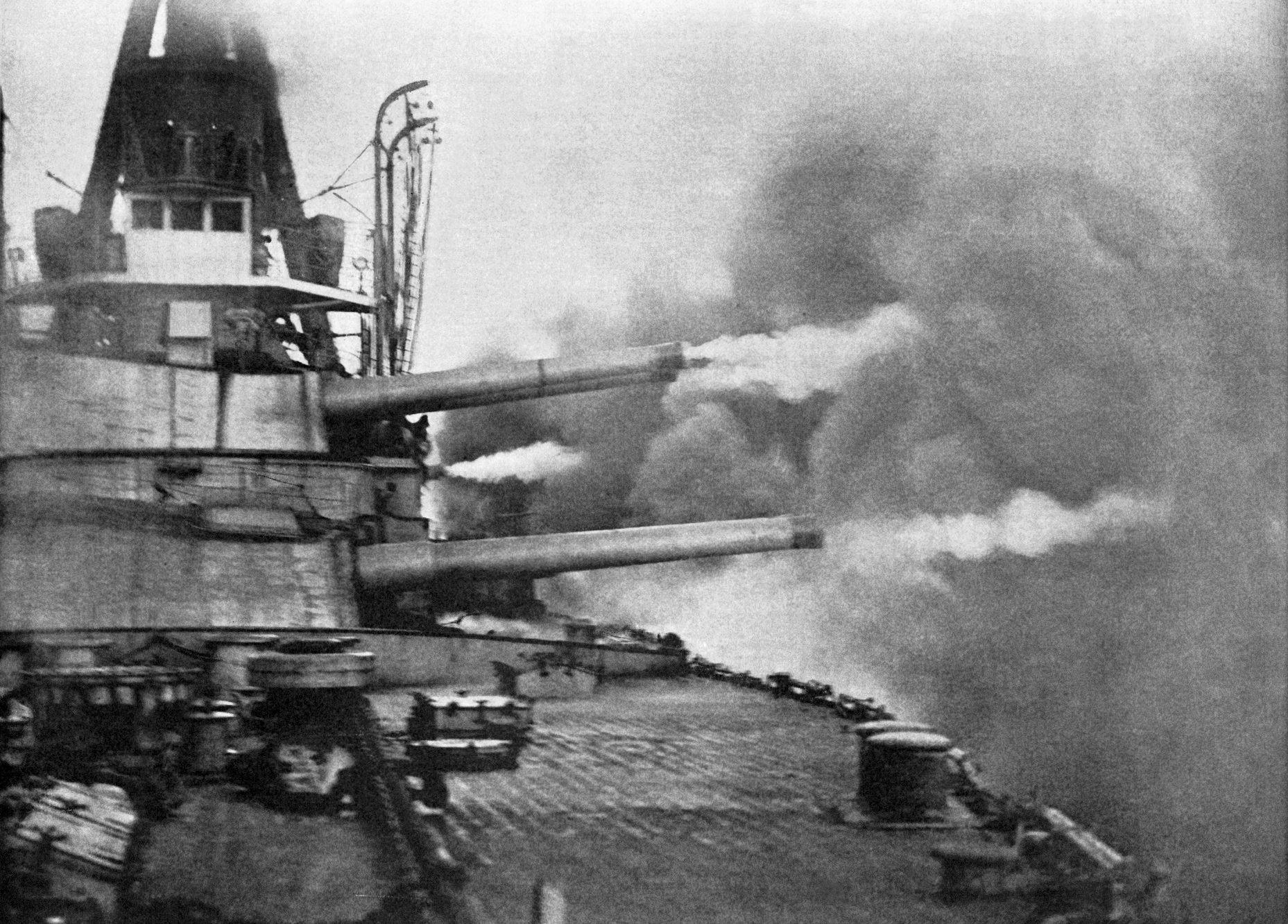
The Brazilian Minas Geraes class kindled an Argentine–Brazilian–Chilean naval arms race

Intellectuals and government leaders in South America turned their backs on the older economic policies and turned toward import substitution industrialization. The goal was to create self-sufficient economies, which would have their own industrial sectors and large middle classes and which would be immune to the ups and downs of the global economy. Despite the potential threats to United States commercial interests, the Roosevelt administration (1933–1945) understood that the United States could not wholly oppose import substitution. Roosevelt implemented a good neighbor policy and allowed the nationalization of some American companies in South America. The Second World War also brought the United States and most Latin American nations together.

The history of South America during World War II is important because of the significant economic, political, and military changes that occurred throughout much of the region as a result of the war. In order to better protect the Panama Canal, combat Axis influence, and optimize the production of goods for the war effort, the United States through Lend-Lease and similar programs greatly expanded its interests in Latin America, resulting in large-scale modernization and a major economic boost for the countries that participated.

Strategically, Brazil was of great importance because of its having the closest point in the Americas to Africa where the Allies were actively engaged in fighting the Germans and Italians. For the Axis, the Southern Cone nations of Argentina and Chile were where they found most of their South American support, and they utilised it to the fullest by interfering with internal affairs, conducting espionage, and distributing propaganda.

Brazil was the only country to send an Expeditionary force to the European theatre; however, several countries had skirmishes with German U-boats and cruisers in the Caribbean and South Atlantic. Mexico sent a fighter squadron of 300 volunteers to the Pacific, the Escuadrón 201 were known as the Aztec Eagles (Aguilas Aztecas).

The Brazilian active participation on the battle field in Europe was divined after the Casablanca Conference. The President of the U.S., Franklin D. Roosevelt on his way back from Morocco met the President of Brazil, Getulio Vargas, in Natal, Rio Grande do Norte, this meeting is known as the Potenji River Conference, and defined the creation of the Brazilian Expeditionary Force.

=== Economics ===
According to author Thomas M. Leonard, World War II had a major impact on Latin American economies. Following the 7 December 1941 Japanese attack on Pearl Harbor, most of Latin America either severed relations with the Axis powers or declared war on them. As a result, many nations (including all of Central America, the Dominican Republic, Mexico, Chile, Peru, Argentina, and Venezuela) suddenly found that they were now dependent on the United States for trade. The United States' high demand for particular products and commodities during the war further distorted trade. For example, the United States wanted all of the platinum produced in Colombia, all the silver of Chile, and all of cotton, gold and copper of Peru. The parties agreed upon set prices, often with a high premium, but the various nations lost their ability to bargain and trade in the open market.

=== Cold War ===
Wars became less frequent in the 20th century, with Bolivia-Paraguay and Peru-Ecuador fighting the last inter-state wars. Early in the 20th century, the three wealthiest South American countries engaged in a vastly expensive naval arms race which was catalyzed by the introduction of a new warship type, the "dreadnought". At one point, the Argentine government was spending a fifth of its entire yearly budget for just two dreadnoughts, a price that did not include later in-service costs, which for the Brazilian dreadnoughts was sixty percent of the initial purchase.

The continent became a battlefield of the Cold War in the late 20th century. Some democratically elected governments of Argentina, Brazil, Chile, Uruguay, and Paraguay were overthrown or displaced by military dictatorships in the 1960s and 1970s. To curtail opposition, their governments detained tens of thousands of political prisoners, many of whom were tortured and/or killed on inter-state collaboration. Economically, they began a transition to neoliberal economic policies. They placed their own actions within the US Cold War doctrine of "National Security" against internal subversion. Throughout the 1980s and 1990s, Peru suffered from an internal conflict. South America, like many other continents, became a battlefield for the superpowers during the Cold War in the late 20th century. In the postwar period, the expansion of communism became the greatest political issue for both the United States and governments in the region. The start of the Cold War forced governments to choose between the United States and the Soviet Union.

=== Late 20th century military regimes and revolutions ===
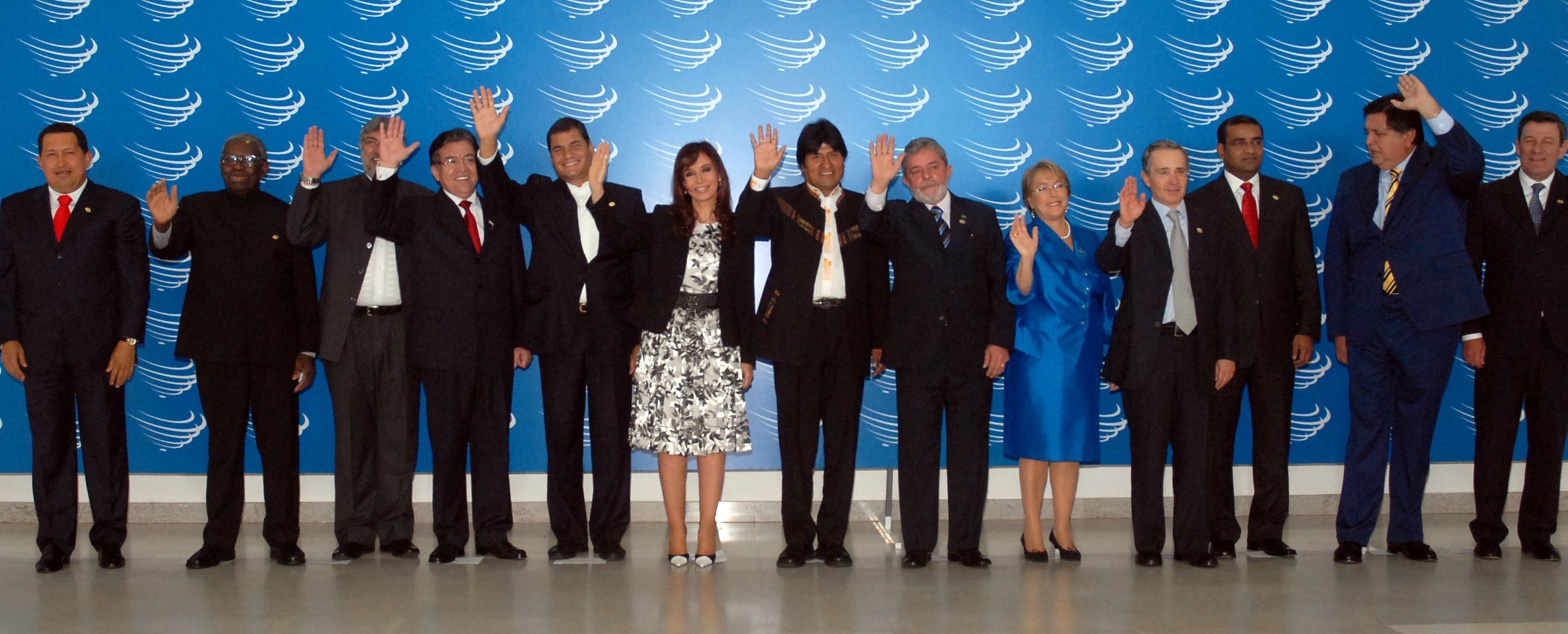
Presidents of UNASUR member states at the Second Summit on 23 May 2008.

By the 1970s, leftists had acquired a significant political influence which prompted the right-wing, ecclesiastical authorities and a large portion of each individual country's upper class to support coups d'état to avoid what they perceived as a communist threat. This was further fueled by Cuban and United States intervention which led to a political polarisation. Most South American countries were in some periods ruled by military dictatorships that were supported by the United States of America.

Also around the 1970s, the regimes of the Southern Cone collaborated in Operation Condor killing many leftist dissidents, including some urban guerrillas. However, by the early 1990s all countries had restored their democracies.

Colombia has had an ongoing, though diminished internal conflict, which started in 1964 with the creation of Marxist guerrillas (FARC-EP) and then involved several illegal armed groups of leftist-leaning ideology as well as the private armies of powerful drug lords. Many of these are now defunct, and only a small portion of the ELN remains, along with the stronger, though also greatly reduced FARC. These leftist groups smuggle narcotics out of Colombia to fund their operations, while also using kidnapping, bombings, land mines and assassinations as weapons against both elected and non-elected citizens.

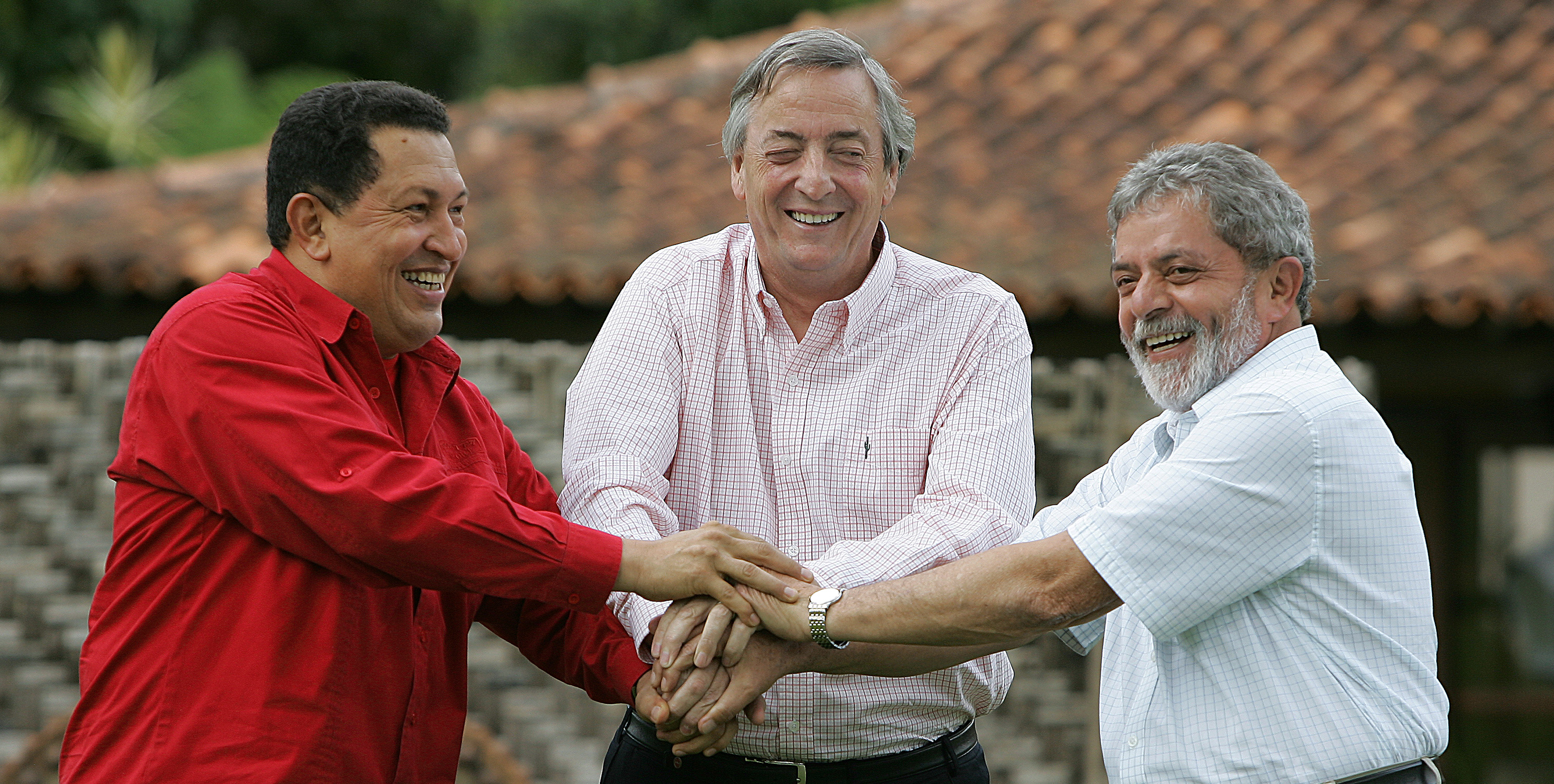
Presidents Hugo Chávez, Néstor Kirchner, and Luiz Inácio Lula da Silva met on 19 January 2006, in Granja do Torto

Flag of the Union of South American Nations

Revolutionary movements and right-wing military dictatorships became common after World War II, but since the 1980s, a wave of democratisation came through the continent, and democratic rule is widespread now. Nonetheless, allegations of corruption are still very common, and several countries have developed crises which have forced the resignation of their governments, although, in most occasions, regular civilian succession has continued.

In the 1960s and 1970s, the governments of Argentina, Brazil, Chile, and Uruguay were overthrown or displaced by U.S.-aligned military dictatorships. These detained tens of thousands of political prisoners, many of whom were tortured and/or killed (on inter-state collaboration, see Operation Condor). Economically, they began a transition to neoliberal economic policies. They placed their own actions within the U.S. Cold War doctrine of "National Security" against internal subversion. Throughout the 1980s and 1990s, Peru suffered from an internal conflict (see Túpac Amaru Revolutionary Movement and Shining Path). Revolutionary movements and right-wing military dictatorships have been common, but starting in the 1980s a wave of democratization came through the continent, and democratic rule is now widespread. Allegations of corruption remain common, and several nations have seen crises which have forced the resignation of their presidents, although normal civilian succession has continued. International indebtedness became a recurrent problem, with examples like the 1980s debt crisis, the mid-1990s Mexican peso crisis and Argentina's 2001 default.

=== Washington Consensus ===
The set of specific economic policy prescriptions that were considered the "standard" reform package were promoted for crisis-wracked developing countries by Washington, DC–based institutions such as the International Monetary Fund (IMF), World Bank, and the US Treasury Department during the 1980s and '90s.

== 21st century ==
=== A turn to the left ===
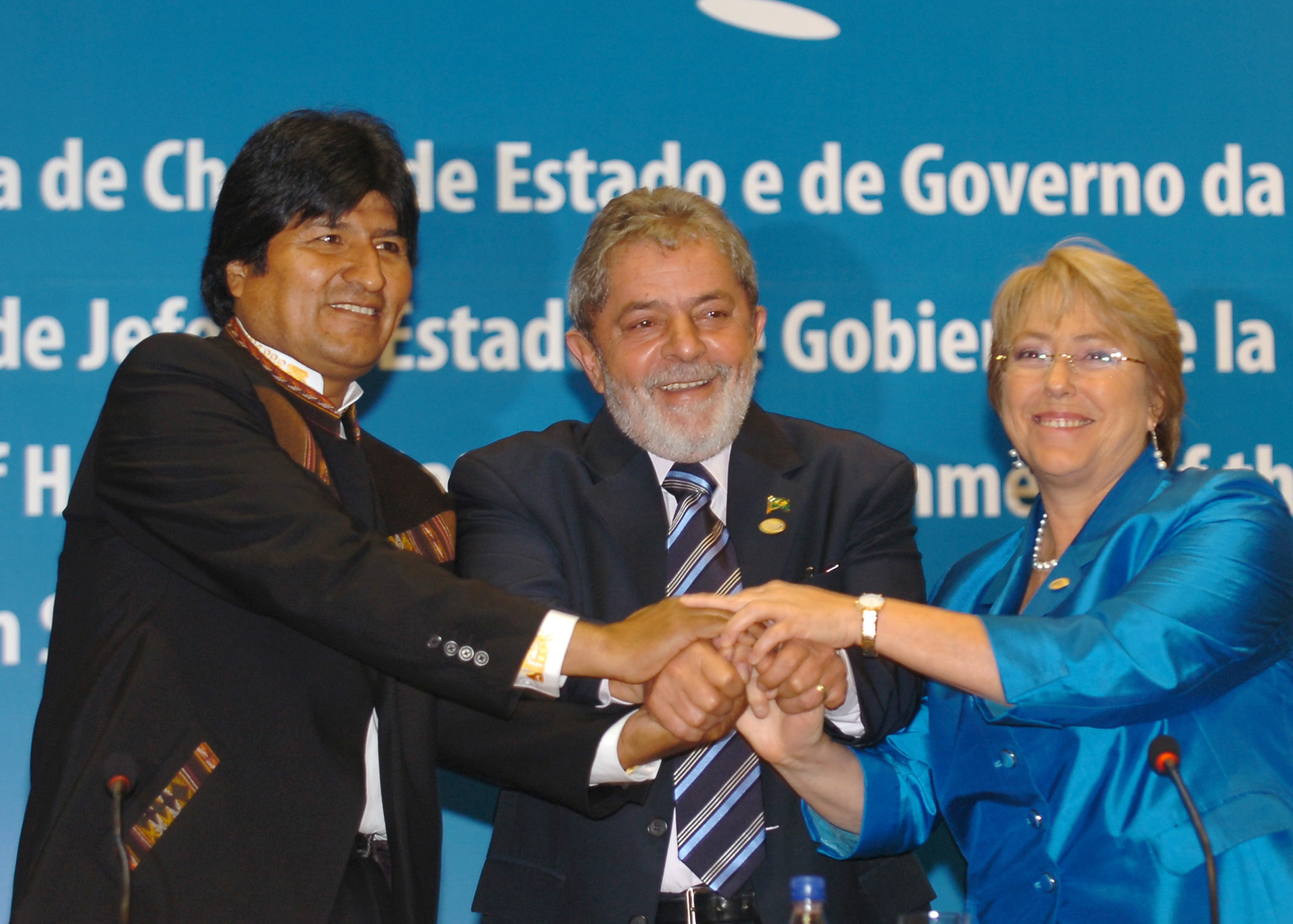
Left-leaning leaders of Bolivia, Brazil and Chile at the Union of South American Nations summit in 2008

According to the BBC, a "common element of the 'pink tide' is a clean break with what was known at the outset of the 1990s as the 'Washington consensus', the mixture of open markets and privatisation pushed by the United States". According to Cristina Fernández de Kirchner, a pink tide president herself, Hugo Chávez of Venezuela (inaugurated 1999), Luiz Inácio Lula da Silva of Brazil (inaugurated 2003) and Evo Morales of Bolivia (inaugurated 2006) were "the three musketeers" of the left in South America. By 2005, the BBC reported that out of 350 million people in South America, three out of four of them lived in countries ruled by "left-leaning presidents" elected during the preceding six years.

Despite the presence of a number of Latin American governments which profess to embrace a leftist ideology, it is difficult to categorize Latin American states "according to dominant political tendencies, like a red-blue post-electoral map of the United States." According to the Institute for Policy Studies, a liberal non-profit think-tank based in Washington, D.C.: "a deeper analysis of elections in Ecuador, Venezuela, Nicaragua, and Mexico indicates that the "pink tide" interpretation—that a diluted trend leftward is sweeping the continent—may be insufficient to understand the complexity of what's really taking place in each country and the region as a whole".

While this political shift is difficult to quantify, its effects are widely noticed. According to the Institute for Policy Studies, 2006 meetings of the South American Summit of Nations and the Social Forum for the Integration of Peoples demonstrated that certain discussions that "used to take place on the margins of the dominant discourse of neoliberalism, (have) now moved to the centre of public debate."

=== Pink tide ===
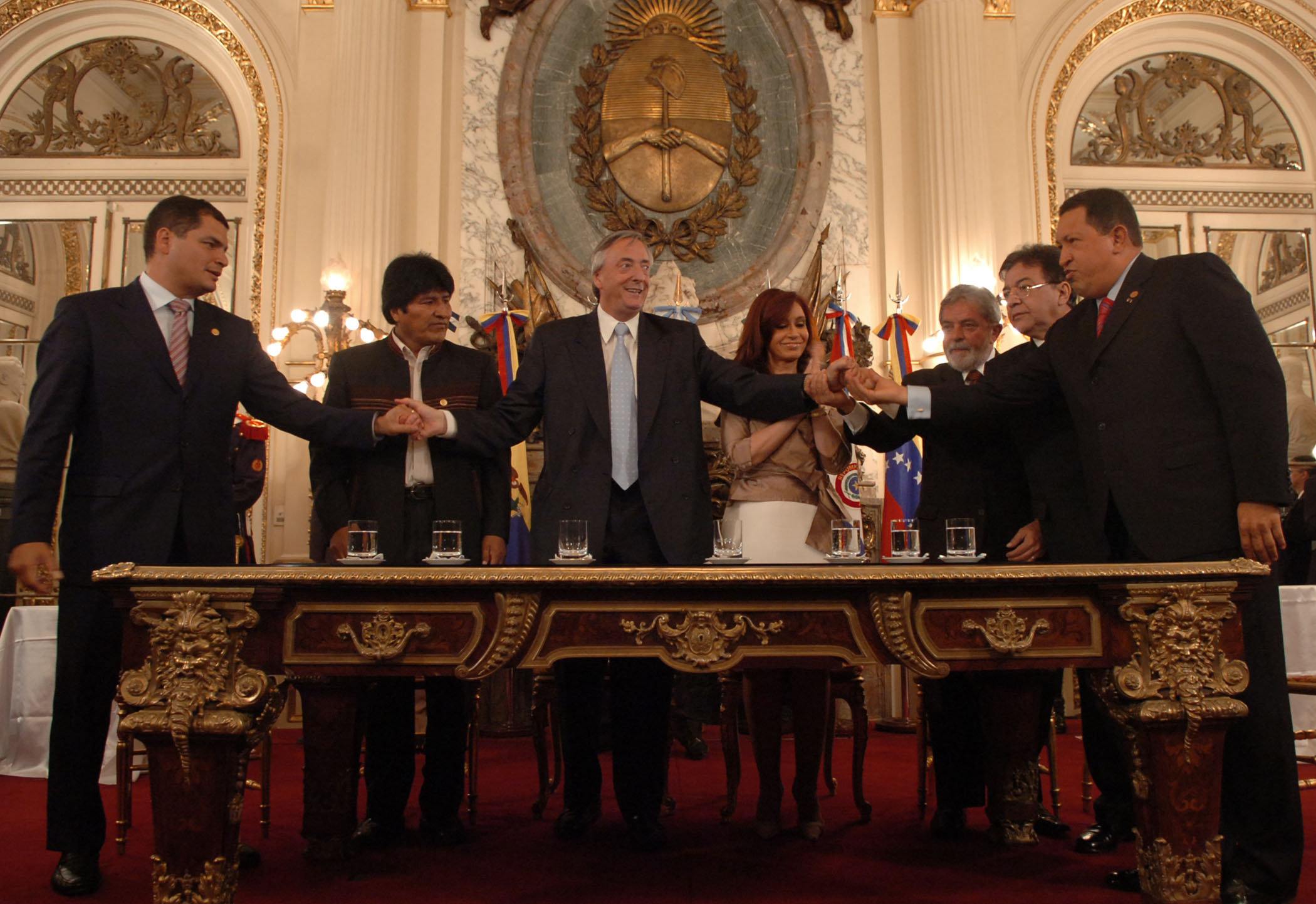
Rafael Correa, Evo Morales, Néstor Kirchner, Cristina Fernández de Kirchner, Luiz Inácio Lula da Silva, Nicanor Duarte, and Hugo Chávez at the signing of the founding charter of the Bank of the South

The term 'pink tide' (Spanish: marea rosa, Portuguese: onda rosa) or 'turn to the Left' (Sp.: vuelta hacia la izquierda, Pt.: Guinada à Esquerda) are phrases which are used in contemporary 21st century political analysis in the media and elsewhere to describe the perception that leftist ideology in general, and left-wing politics in particular, were increasingly becoming influential in Latin America.

Since the 2000s or 1990s in some countries, left-wing political parties have risen to power. Hugo Chávez in Venezuela, Luiz Inácio Lula da Silva and Dilma Rousseff in Brazil, Fernando Lugo in Paraguay, Néstor and Cristina Fernández de Kirchner in Argentina, Tabaré Vázquez and José Mujica in Uruguay, the Lagos and Bachelet governments in Chile, Evo Morales in Bolivia, and Rafael Correa of Ecuador are all part of this wave of left-wing politicians who also often declare themselves socialists, Latin Americanists or anti-imperialists.

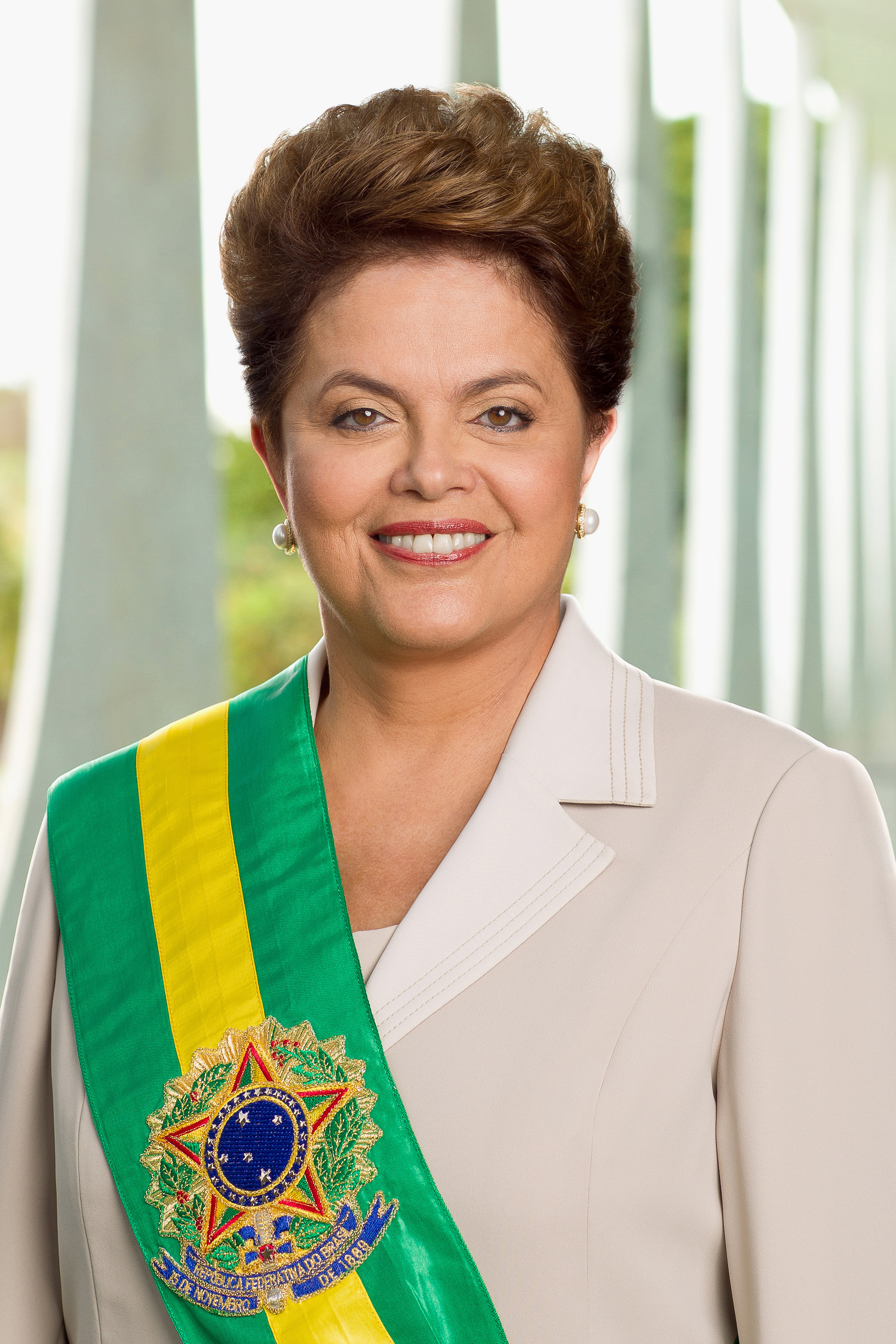
Her Excellency Dilma Rousseff, 36th President of Brazil

The list of leftist South American presidents is, by date of election, the following

- 1998: Hugo Chávez, Venezuela
- 1999: Ricardo Lagos, Chile
- 2002: Luiz Inácio Lula da Silva, Brazil
- 2002: Lucio Gutiérrez, Ecuador
- 2003: Néstor Kirchner, Argentina
- 2004: Tabaré Vázquez, Uruguay
- 2005: Evo Morales, Bolivia (Note: Morales is described as the first indigenous president of Bolivia in academic studies of his presidency, such as those of Muñoz-Pogossian, Webber, Philip and Panizza, and Farthing and Kohl, as well as in press reports, such as those of BBC News. However, there have been challenges to this claim by critics who have asserted that Morales probably has some European ancestry, and thus on genetic grounds is technically mestizo rather than solely indigenous. Harten asserted that this argument was "misguided[,] wrong[... and] above all irrelevant" because regardless of his genetic makeup, the majority of Bolivians perceive Morales as being the first indigenous president. In Bolivian society, indigeneity is a fluid concept rooted in cultural identity; for instance, many indigenous individuals that have settled in urban areas and abandoned their traditional rural customs have come to identify as mestizo.)
- 2006: Michelle Bachelet, Chile
- 2006: Rafael Correa, Ecuador
- 2007: Cristina Fernández de Kirchner, Argentina (Note: She is variously known as Cristina Fernández, Cristina K, or Cristina.)
- 2008: Fernando Lugo, Paraguay
- 2010: José Mujica, Uruguay
- 2010: Dilma Rousseff, Brazil
- 2011: Ollanta Humala, Peru
- 2013: Nicolás Maduro, Venezuela
- 2014: Michelle Bachelet, Chile
- 2015: Tabaré Vázquez, Uruguay
- 2017: Lenín Moreno, Ecuador
- 2019: Alberto Fernández, Argentina
- 2020: Luis Arce, Bolivia
- 2021: Pedro Castillo, Peru
- 2022: Gabriel Boric Font, Chile
- 2022: Gustavo Petro, Colombia
- 2023: Luiz Inácio Lula da Silva, Brazil
- 2025: Yamandu Orsi, Uruguay
- 2025: Jennifer Geerlings-Simons, Suriname

=== Politics ===
During the first decade of the 21st century, South American governments move to the political left, with leftist leaders being elected in Chile, Uruguay, Brazil, Argentina, Ecuador, Bolivia, Paraguay, Peru, and Venezuela. Most South American countries are making an increasing use of protectionist policies, undermining a greater global integration but helping local development.

In 2008, the Union of South American Nations (USAN) was founded, which aimed to merge the two existing customs unions, Mercosur and the Andean Community, thus forming the third-largest trade bloc in the world. The organization is planning for political integration in the European Union style, seeking to establish free movement of people, economic development, a common defense policy and the elimination of tariffs. According to Noam Chomsky, USAN represents that "for the first time since the European conquest, Latin America began to move towards integration".

=== 2020s ===
In the 2020s the political right has achieved significant electoral victories in many South American countries. Right-wing presidential candidates were elected in Argentina 2023, Ecuador 2025, Bolivia 2025,Chile 2025, Peru 2026 and Colombia 2026.

=== Recent heads of state in South America ===
- 2010: Dilma Rousseff, Brazil
- 2010: José Mujica, Uruguay
- 2010: Sebastián Piñera, Chile
- 2010: (Colombia) Juan Manuel Santos
- 2011: Ollanta Humala, Peru
- 2013: Nicolás Maduro, Venezuela
- 2013: Horacio Cartés, Paraguay
- 2014: Michelle Bachelet, Chile
- 2015: Mauricio Macri, Argentina
- 2015: Tabaré Vázquez, Uruguay
- 2015: David Granger, Guyana
- 2016: Michel Temer, Brazil
- 2016: Pedro Pablo Kuczynski Godard, Peru
- 2017: Lenín Moreno, Ecuador
- 2018: Sebastián Piñera, Chile
- 2018: Iván Duque Márquez, Colombia
- 2018: Martín Vizcarra, Peru
- 2018: Mario Abdo, Paraguay
- 2019: Jair Bolsonaro, Brazil
- 2019: Alberto Fernández, Argentina
- 2020: Luis Lacalle, Uruguay
- 2020: Luis Arce, Bolivia
- 2020: Manuel Merino de Lama, Peru
- 2020: Chandrikapersad "Chan" Santokhi, Suriname
- 2020: Irfaan Ali, Guyana
- 2020: Francisco Sagasti, Peru
- 2021: Guillermo Lasso, Ecuador
- 2021: Pedro Castillo, Peru
- 2022: Gabriel Boric Font, Chile
- 2022: Gustavo Petro, Colombia
- 2022: Dina Boluarte, Peru
- 2023: Luiz Inácio Lula da Silva, Brazil
- 2023: Santiago Peña, Paraguay
- 2023: Daniel Noboa, Ecuador
- 2023: Javier Milei, Argentina
- 2025: Yamandu Orsi, Uruguay
- 2025: Jennifer Geerlings-Simons, Suriname
- 2025: José Jerí, Peru
- 2025: Rodrigo Paz, Bolivia
- 2026: José María Balcázar, Peru
- 2026: Jose Antonio Kast, Chile
- 2026: Keiko Fujimori, Peru
- 2026: Abelardo de la Espriella, Colombia

== See also ==
- Decolonization of the Americas
- History of Latin America
- Military history of South America
