= Lorenzo Alcantuz =

Colombian revolutionary

Lorenzo Alcantuz (1741 – 1 February 1782) was a Colombian revolutionary. He was born in Sogamoso. Alongside Jose Antonio Galan, he was a key leader of the Revolución Comunera of 1781. This is considered to be the most important revolutionary movement in New Granada/Colombia prior to the achievement of national independence in the early 19th century.

The insurrection was triggered by violent riots in Simacota, Mogotes, Barichara and Curití in December 1780. The town of San Gil quickly joined the protests and it was there that Alcantuz carried out the symbolic revolutionary act of trampling on the royal coat of arms, which represented Spanish colonial power. The authorities took a dim view of the insurgency, and the main instigators Alcantuz, Galán, Isidro Molina and Juan Manuel José Ortiz were all hanged in Bogotá on 1 February 1782. They were then decapitated and their dead bodies quartered and burned. Alcantuz's head was displayed in San Gil.

An indoor stadium in San Gil is now named after him.
