= Manuela Beltrán =

Manuela Beltran
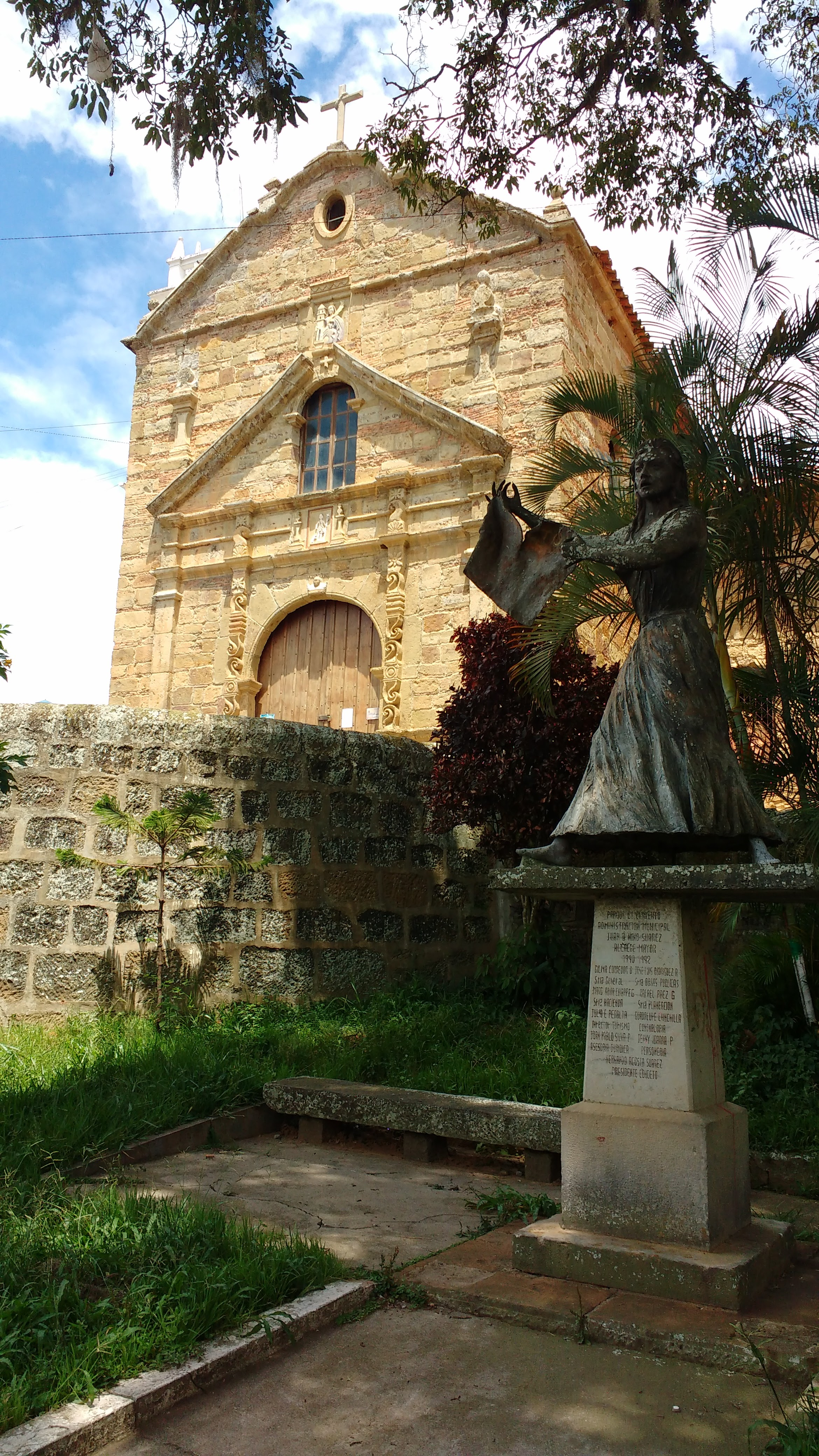
- Picture of a commemorative statue of Beltran in Socorro, Santander, photographed in 2016
- Born: c. 1750; Villa del Socorro, Santander, Viceroyalty of New Granada
- Died: unknown date unknown place

Manuela Beltrán was a Neogranadine woman who organized a peasant revolt against excess taxation in 1780.

== General settings ==
The information concerning the biography of Manuela Beltran is scarce and fragmented. It is believed she was of peasant origin, was born around 1750, and lived most of her life in Villa del Socorro, Santander, where she ran her own small grocery store, at the main square of Socorro; at the time, in the Viceroyalty of New Granada, it was very uncommon for a woman to own her own business. Besides, Beltran was one of the few people in the region that could read and write, given the virtually complete illiteracy of the population due to the absence of education facilities.

== The taxation ==
During the first half of the 18th century, the Spanish Empire was focused on the improvement of its military force, especially the Infanteria de Marina, since the main economic interests of the empire depended of the complete control of its American colonies. By 1717, the Cuerpo de Batallones de Marina was definitively settled and organized, reaching its full strength of twelve battalions. The first ones were named: Armada, Bajeles, Marina, Oceano, Mediterráneo and Barlovento. Their mission was to form the "Main body of landing columns and ship's soldiers tasks" in a time when boarding was still a critical part of battle at sea.

The major actions they took part in during this period were: Sardinia, 1717; Naples and Sicily, 1732; Defense of Havana, 1762; Algiers expedition, 1775; Siege of Pensacola, (1781) and Siege of Toulon (1793).

These military actions demanded a large amount of money and resources, which resulted in larger taxations for the people living in the colonies. The new harsh taxation regimen (implemented and promoted by General Visitor Juan Francisco Gutiérrez de Piñeres, and ratified by the Viceroy and Archbishop Antonio Caballero y Góngora) included the raise on the Alcabala, taxes over the consumption of Aguardiente and Tobacco, taxes over the entry of merchandises, and a sales tax.

== The revolt ==
The edict of the new taxation regimen was placed in the main square of Socorro on March 16, 1781. Since Beltran could read, she informed the crowd about the dispositions, which was greeted with general outrage. She tore apart the document and led the strike action which extended to over sixty cities and towns in the Andean Region of Colombia and Llanos. The revolt eventually ended with a fake negotiation offered by the Viceroy, followed by the capture and execution of most of the revolt leaders including José Antonio Galán. Whether or not Manuela Beltran was also executed remains unclear.

== Cultural relevancy ==
- Manuela Beltran is a common name for elementary schools, institutions and neighborhoods throughout Colombia.
- A popular television series in Colombia in the 1980s was based on her life.
- Manuela Beltrán University is named after her.
