= Juan de Torrezar Díaz Pimienta =

Spanish military officer and colonial official

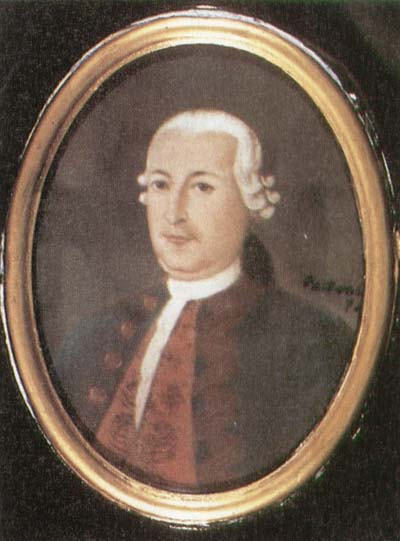
Juan de Torrezal Díaz Pimienta, Spanish governor of Cartagena, Viceroy of New Granada

Juan de Torrezar Díaz Pimienta (sometimes Juan de Torrezal Díaz Pimienta) (died 11 June 1782 in Bogotá) was a Spanish military officer and colonial official. He was twice governor of Cartagena de Indias, after which he was promoted to viceroy of New Granada.

== Background ==
He was a brigadier in the royal army and a knight of the Order of Carlos III. In 1779 he was promoted to field marshal. He was governor of the province of Cartagena two times. The first time was from 12 May 1774 to 14 September 1780, the second was from 1 May 1781 to 21 April 1782.

During his government, Lieutenant Antonio de Latorre founded 43 pueblos, in which 41,000 persons were settled. One of these was Montería.

== As viceroy of New Granada ==
He took possession of his new office on 1 April 1782, still in Cartagena. Before leaving that city, he announced a generous amnesty for those charged in the Revolt of the Comuneros. On 21 April he left Cartagena to take up his new position in Santafé de Bogotá, the capital of the viceroyalty. He was already old and infirm, although he had recently married a 17-year-old Cartagena native, María de Salas. His predecessor, Manuel Antonio Flórez, a popular viceroy who had served more than 11 years in the office, had apparently been forced to resign by José de Gálvez, Minister of the Indies in Spain, and Antonio Caballero y Góngora, Archbishop of Bogotá.

Torrezal Díaz was received along the way at Honda by Archbishop Caballero y Góngora. A great banquet was held in his honor. It was said that the archbishop, who was present at the banquet, did not eat. Torrezal Díaz did, however. He arrived at the capital one week later (7 June). He was very sick and died in agony four days after his arrival. Some believed that he had been poisoned by the archbishop.

The official report of his death said he died of infection. A sealed royal document intended to be opened only in the event of his death identified Archbishop Caballero y Góngora as his replacement.

Government offices
Preceded by Manuel Antonio Flores	Viceroy of New Granada; 1782	Succeeded by Antonio Caballero y Góngora
