= Comunero =

Comunero may refer to:

- Revolt of the Comuneros, a rebellion in Castile in 1520–1521
- Revolt of the Comuneros (Paraguay), a revolt in Paraguay in 1721–1735
- Revolt of the Comuneros (New Granada), a revolt in New Granada (modern Colombia) in 1779–1781.
- Comunera Province, a province in Santander Department of Colombia
- Villalar de los Comuneros, a town in Castile and León, Spain
- Comuneros (TransMilenio), a bus station in Bogotá
