= José Antonio Galán =

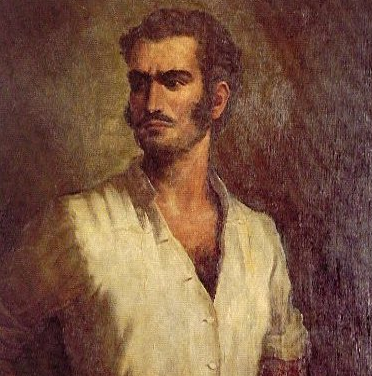
- José Antonio Galán, leader of the Comuneros insurrection
- Born: 1749; Charalá, Santander (New Kingdom of Granada
- Died: February 2, 1782 (aged 32–33); Santafé de Bogotá (Id.)
- Occupation: Leader of the Comuneros insurrection
- Known for: Historical figure of the 18th century

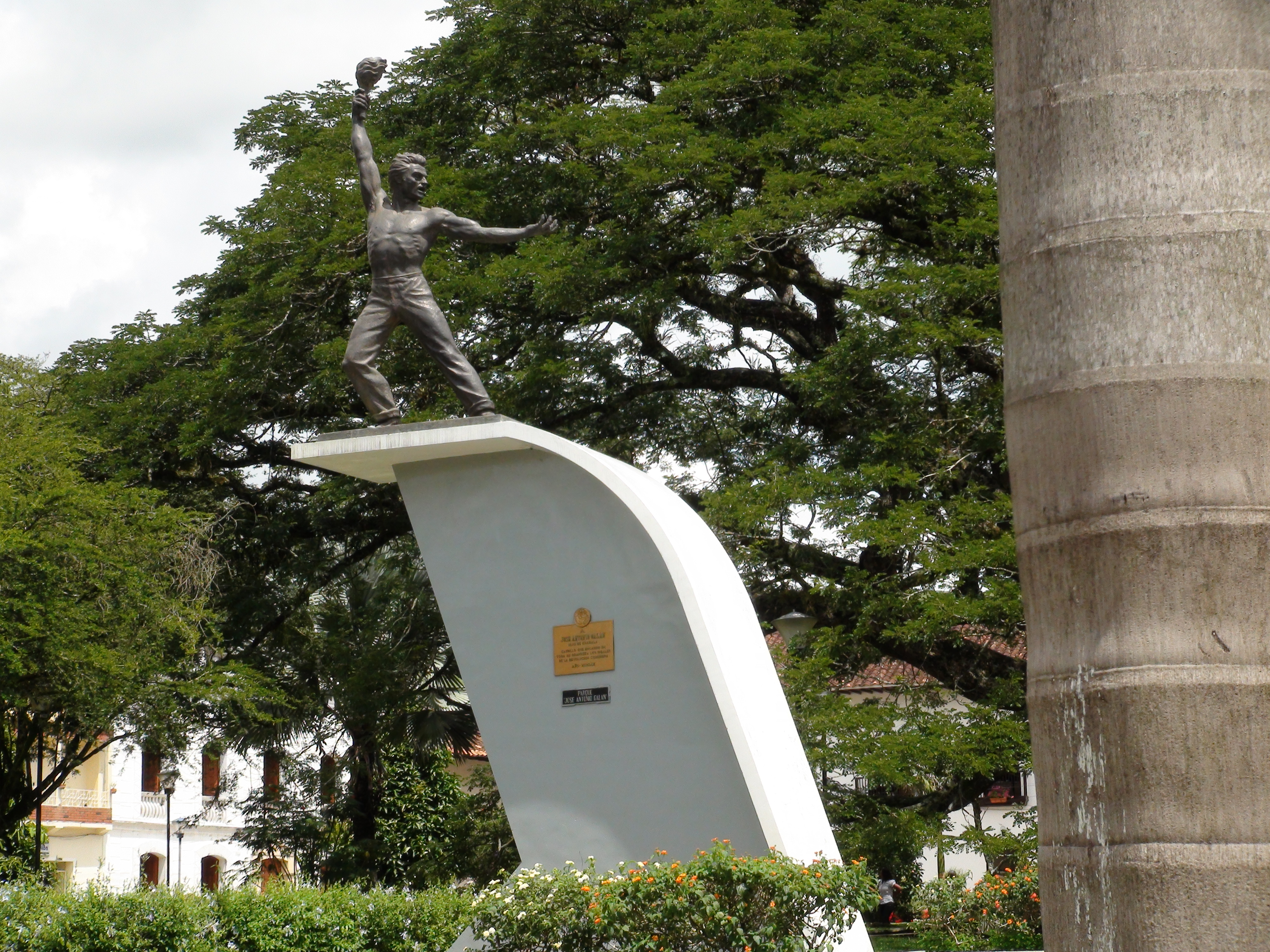
Monument in Colombia in honor of José Antonio Galán.

José Antonio Galán (c. 1749 in Charalá, Santander (New Kingdom of Granada) – February 2, 1782 in Santafé de Bogotá (Id.) was a Neogranadine historical figure of the 18th century.

== Biography ==
He was the son of the Spaniard Antonio Galán, a small tobacco farmer, and the mestiza María de Argüello, a cotton weaver.

From 1776 onwards the economic situation deteriorated due to diseases, crop failures and high taxes, which led to a popular uprising on March 16, 1781, in the town of Socorro, Santander. By the end of April, a large number of people of humble origins, reaching 20,000 men, under the leadership of a prominent citizen, Juan Francisco Berbeo, marched to the capital Santafé de Bogotá with their demands, under the slogan "Long live the King and death to bad government." Among his prominent captains was José Antonio Galán.

After delays and consultations, Archbishop Caballero and the Comunero commander Juan Francisco Berbeo signed a capitulation agreement in Zipaquirá on June 7, 1781. Among its main points were the reduction of taxes for the poor, lower prices for goods such as salt, and reforms to the justice system. Following this agreement, the Comunero troops disbanded, and their leaders, who had avoided extremist tactics during the campaign, confident in the gains they had achieved, returned to their villages.

Later, Viceroy Manuel Antonio Flórez annulled the capitulation agreement, prompting Galán and his followers, to attempt a new uprising and march toward Santafé, carrying the banner of the King of Spain as a sign of submission to the Monarchy. On October 13, they were captured by order of the Royal Audiencia and taken to the capital.
His trial began in November, and in Galán's death sentence, which also included his three most loyal lieutenants, it was ordered that he be hanged, dismembered, his limbs sent to different places, and that his descendants be declared infamous, as a clear warning to anyone who might attempt an other rebellion.

== Legacy ==
Galán became a symbol of resistance in Colombia. His fight for equality and the rights of the oppressed inspired future generations, and he is remembered as one of the early forerunners of Colombian independence. The Comunero movement, although suppressed, was a key precursor to the independence movements that would emerge 25 years later throughout Latin America.

In Colombia, several locations and public spaces bear his name in honor of his struggle. Furthermore, his figure has been reclaimed by social movements that see him as a folk hero who defended the most vulnerable against colonial oppression.
His depiction appeared on the 1,000 Colombian peso banknote in 1979.

== See also ==
- Revolt of the Comuneros (New Granada)
- Lorenzo Alcantuz
- Manuela Beltrán

== Bibliography ==
- AGUILERA Peña, Mario. "Los comuneros: guerra social y lucha anticolonial". Bogotá, Universidad Nacional de Colombia, 1985.
- ARCINIEGAS, Germán. "20.000 Comuneros hacia Santa Fe". Bogotá, Pluma, 1981.
- CASTELLANOS TAPIAS, Luis. "El Alzamiento". Bogotá, Ediciones Edicrón-Editorial Guadalupe, 1962. A novel set around the Comunero movement (1781) of the Virreinato de Nueva Granada.
- FRIEDE, Juan. "Rebelión comunera de 1781. Documentos". Bogotá, Colcultura, 1981.
- GUTIERREZ, José Fulgencio. "Galán y los Comuneros". Bucaramanga, Imprenta Departamental, 1939.
- PHELAN, John Leddy. "El pueblo y el rey. La revolución comunera en Colombia, 1781". Bogotá, Carlos Valencia, 1980
