= Manuel Antonio Flórez =

Mexican politician

The Most Excellent Manuel Antonio Flórez KOA
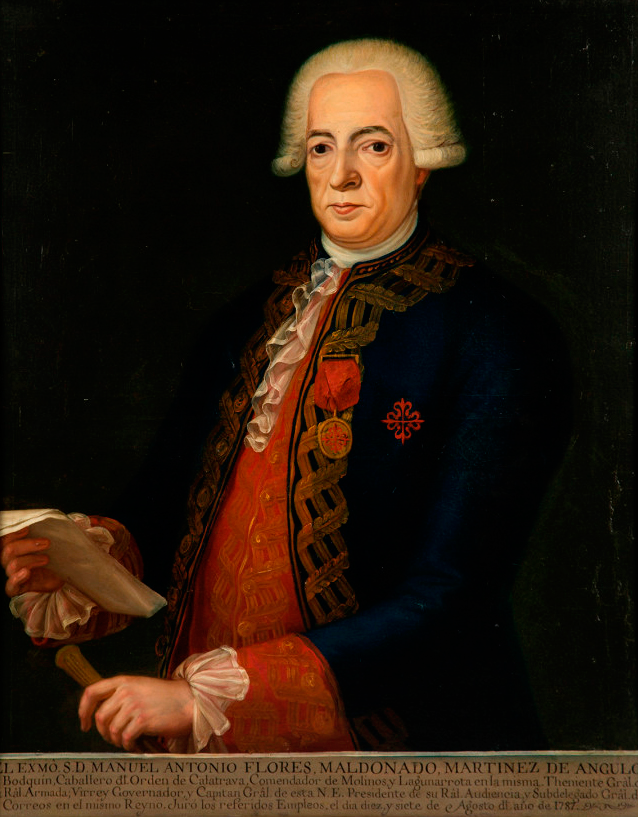

51st Viceroy of New Spain
- In office August 17, 1787 – October 16, 1789
- Monarchs: Charles III; Charles IV
- Preceded by: Alonso Núñez de Haro y Peralta
- Succeeded by: Juan Vicente de Güemes, 2nd Count of Revillagigedo

Viceroy of New Granada
- In office 1776 – November 23, 1781
- Monarch: Charles III
- Preceded by: Manuel de Guirior
- Succeeded by: Juan de Torrezar Díaz Pimienta

Personal details
- Born: Manuel Antonio Flórez Maldonado Martínez Ángulo y Bodquín; May 27, 1723 Seville, Spain
- Died: March 20, 1799 (aged 75–76) Madrid, Spain

Manuel Antonio Flórez Maldonado Martínez Ángulo y Bodquín (in full, Manuel Antonio Flórez Maldonado) (May 27, 1723, in Seville, Spain – March 20, 1799, in Madrid) was a general in the Spanish navy and viceroy of New Granada (1776 – November 26, 1781) and New Spain (August 17, 1787 to October 16, 1789).

== Early career ==
Flórez entered the royal navy of Spain, where he commanded various ships of war fighting pirates, in both the Mediterranean and in Spanish possessions in America. He distinguished himself for his valor as well as his knowledge, and was made a knight of the military Order of Calatrava. He became commandant of the Naval Department at el Ferrol, a major naval base, shipbuilding center and arsenal in northwestern Spain. He served in that position for four years (1771–75).

Flórez was named viceroy of New Granada, and sailed to take up the position on December 3, 1775. He served in this capacity for 6 years. He was well liked in New Grenada, until 1781, when he was confronted with the Revolt of the Comuneros. He resigned on 26 November 1781 and returned to Spain, citing ill health. However, his resignation was apparently motivated by dissatisfaction of José de Gálvez, Minister of the Indies, and Archbishop Antonio Caballero y Góngora of Bogotá.

== As Viceroy of New Spain ==
In 1787 he was named viceroy of New Spain and president of the Audiencia of Mexico. He arrived in Veracruz on July 18, 1787 and took possession of his new offices in Mexico City on August 17.

In office, he raised three new battalions of volunteers, those of Mexico, Nueva España, and Puebla. He refused to share his authority with Fernando José Mangino, who had been named superintendent of New Spain (1787).

He intervened in a dispute between missionaries and the military governor of California. He arranged that the sons of the largest landowners of the colony be given high positions in the colonial army. In 1788 he arranged with the Spanish government to bring in 11 German miners from Dresden to teach Mexican miners recent technical advances in metallurgy.

During his administration the Real Estudio Botánico opened. On April 28, 1788, the distinguished Mexican historian and Jesuit Francisco Javier Alegre died in exile in Bologna. On June 4, 1788, the expedition of Esteban José Martínez sailed from San Blas, Nayarit, in the Princesa to explore the North Pacific coast. This expedition sailed as far as the Bering Strait. On August 12, 1788, Lorenzo de Zavala was born in Yucatán. He was later vice-president of the independent Republic of Texas.

King Charles III died on December 14, 1788, after a long reign. The sumptuous obsequies after his death cost the treasury of New Spain a great deal. Viceroy Flórez was personally very affected, because Charles III had been his protector.

The Audiencia informed the Crown of Flórez's failing health, and he was ordered to step down because of it. He was granted six months' additional pay to cover his expenses on the return to Spain. He returned there on October 16, 1789, where he was awarded the Cross of the Order of Charles III and named honorary Captain general of the Navy. He died in Madrid on March 20, 1799.

Government offices
Preceded by Manuel de Guirior	Viceroy of New Granada; 1776–1787	Succeeded by Juan de Torrezar Díaz Pimienta
Preceded by Alonso Núñez de Haro y Peralta	Viceroy of New Spain; 1787–1789	Succeeded by Juan Vicente de Güemes Padilla Horcasitas
