= Betilde Muñoz-Pogossian =

Venezuelan political scientist

- Education: University of South Florida; Florida International University
- Scientific career
- Fields: Political science
- Workplaces: Organization of American States

Betilde Muñoz-Pogossian is a Venezuelan political scientist and international affairs official. She has worked as a director and election observer at the Organization of American States (OAS), including as Director of the Department for Electoral Cooperation and Observation from 2011 to 2014 and then as Director of the Department of Social Inclusion.

== Education ==
Muñoz-Pogossian was born in Venezuela. She attended the University of South Florida, where she obtained a Master's degree in international relations. In 2005, she graduated from Florida International University with a PhD in political science.

== Career ==
After obtaining her PhD, Muñoz-Pogossian became the Chief of the Electoral Studies and Projects Section of the Organization of American States in 2006, and she remained in that role until 2012. In that capacity, she managed the process of systematizing electoral observation methodology. She subsequently worked as a Director of other departments within the OAS, including running the Department of Electoral Cooperation and Observation from 2011 to 2014. By 2012, her experience as an international election observer included elections in El Salvador, Bolivia, Ecuador, Panama, Mexico, Peru, Guatemala and Costa Rica.

During her work in the area of OAS election observation, Muñoz-Pogossian has been an author of several OAS publications, including the 2013 gender equality document Manual para la incorporación de la perspectiva de género en las Misiones de Observación Electoral de la OEA (Manual for incorporating a gender perspective into OAS Electoral Observation Missions) and the methodology document Observando los Sistemas de Financiamiento Político-Electoral: Un Manual para las Misiones de Observación Electoral de la OEA (Observing Systems of Political and Electoral Finance: A Manual for OAS Electoral Observation Missions).

In 2015 Muñoz-Pogossian became Director of the Department of Social Inclusion at the OAS Secretariat for Access to Rights and Equity. Her mandate in that capacity includes carrying out the work of the OAS in economic, social and cultural rights, including poverty reduction, and the social inclusion of vulnerable groups such as Afro-descendants in Latin America, Indigenous people and people with disabilities, and particularly the social inclusion of migrants and refugees. Her work includes promoting democratization in Latin America, including social inclusion, equitable electoral participation, and women's rights.

In 2018, OAS Secretary General Luis Almagro appointed Muñoz-Pogossian, together with David Smolansky, to coordinate the OAS Working Group for the Crisis of Venezuelan Migrants and Refugees, in order to prepare a report on the situation of displaced Venezuelans and collect resources to support OAS countries in responding to an increase in refugees and migrants.

Muñoz-Pogossian is also a founding member and coordinator of the political science network No Sin Mujeres, which seeks to promote and amplify the work of women dedicated to Latin American Political Science. She has been a regular columnist for the Venezuelan newspaper El Nacional, and the website Caracas Chronicles. She has spoken and written extensively about the effects of the COVID-19 pandemic on economic activity and health outcomes in Latin America and the Caribbean.

In 2008, and again in 2016, she won the Outstanding Performance Award from the OAS Secretary General, which recognizes extraordinary contributions to the organization. She again received an Outstanding Performance Award in 2018. In her capacity as a political scientist, Muñoz-Pogossian has also written various publications related to the topic of democratic institutions, equity and social inclusion with an important focus on gender equality work.

== Selected works ==
- Electoral rules and the transformation of Bolivian politics: the rise of Evo Morales, Palgrave Macmillan, ISBN 9780230608191 (2008)
- "The Role of International Electoral Observation Missions in the Promotion of the Political Rights of Women: The Case of the OAS". Election Law Journal: Rules, Politics, and Policy 12 (1) ISSN 1533-1296 (2013)
- "Equidad en el financiamiento de campañas en América Latina y sus implicaciones para la competitividad electoral: una mirada a las elecciones en Centroamérica, 2010-2014". Colombia International (85): 53-80, ISSN 0121-5612 (2015)
- Reforma a las Organizaciones de Partidos Políticos en América Latina (1978-2015), Pontifical Catholic University of Peru Press, ISBN 978-612-47134-0-8 (2016). Editor, with Flavia Freidenberg
- Equidad e inclusión social: Superando desigualdades hacia sociedades más inclusivas, Secretary General of the OAS, ISBN 978-0-8270-6593-2 (2016). Editor, with Alexandra Barrantes
- Women, Politics, and Democracy in Latin America: Crossing Boundaries of Gender and Politics in the Global South, Springer, ISBN 9781349950096 (2017). Editor, with Tomáš Došek, Flavia Freidenberg, and Mariana Caminotti,
