= Antonio Caballero y Góngora =

Catholic bishop

Archbishop Antonio Caballero y Góngora
- (Arch)Bishop of Córdoba
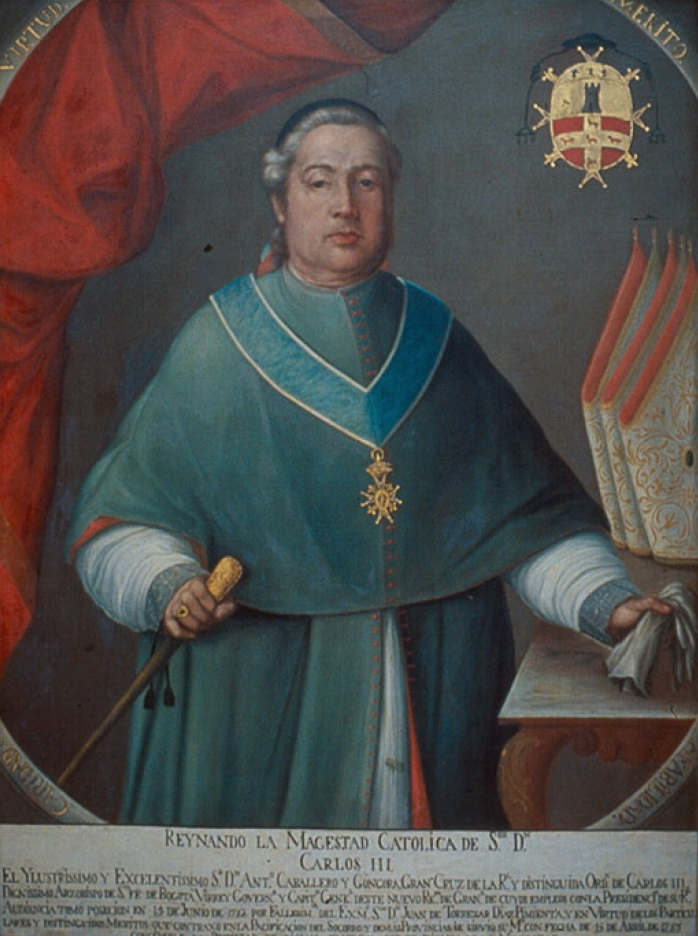
- Antonio Caballero y Góngora, Archbishop of Bogotá and Viceroy of New Granada
- Church: Catholic Church
- Diocese: Diocese of Córdoba
- In office: 15 September 1788 – 24 March 1796
- Predecessor: Baltasar Yusta y Navarro
- Successor: Agustín Ayestarán y Landa
- Previous posts: Archbishop of Santa Fe en Nueva Granada (1778-1788); Bishop of Yucatán (1775-1778); Bishop of Chiapas (1775)

Orders
- Ordination: 19 September 1750 by Antonio Milon
- Consecration: 30 June 1776 by Santiago José de Hechavarría y Elguezúa

Personal details
- Born: 24 May 1723 Priego de Córdoba, Kingdom of Córdoba, Kingdom of Spain
- Died: 24 March 1796 (aged 72) Córdoba, Kingdom of Córdoba, Kingdom of Spain

Antonio Caballero y Góngora (in full, Antonio Pascual de San Pedro de Alcántara Caballero y Góngora) (24 May 1723 in Priego de Córdoba, Córdoba, Spain – 24 March 1796 in Córdoba) was a Spanish Roman Catholic prelate in the colonial Viceroyalty of New Granada, and from 1782 to 1789 the viceroy of New Granada (present day Colombia and Ecuador).

== In Spain and New Spain ==
Antonio Caballero was born into a hidalgo family in Córdoba. His parents were Juan Caballero y Espinar and Antonia de Góngora. He studied first in Córdoba. At the age of 15 he received a scholarship to study theology in the Colegio de San Bartolomé y Santiago in Granada. He continued his studies at the Colegio Imperial de Santa Catalina, graduating in 1744. He was ordained a priest on 19 September 1750. About this time he wrote a biography of the Granadan poet José Antonio Porcel y Salablanca.

In 1753 he was named canon of the cathedral of Córdoba, where he remained until 1775. He was a cultured man and a lover of the arts. He collected paintings by Velázquez, Rubens, Titian, etc., and his library contained the most modern works on all branches of knowledge. He was also a numismatist.

He was named bishop of Mérida in Yucatán in 1775, in the Viceroyalty of New Spain (colonial México). Sailing to Cuba in the spring of 1776 for his consecration, he was accompanied by much of his family and friends, including his nephew Manuel Torres. He brought with him 38 crates of books, rich ornaments, paintings, and coins. He reorganized the Colegio de San Pedro, which had fallen on hard times since the expulsion of the Jesuits in 1767.

== Archbishop of Bogotá ==
In 1777 he was named archbishop of Santa Fé de Bogotá in the colonial Viceroyalty of New Granada by King Charles III, and confirmed by the pope. He arrived there on 5 March 1778. There he worked assiduously and successfully to pacify the rebels of the Comunero Revolt. For his services, King Charles subsequently made him a member of the Order of Carlos III and viceroy of New Granada.

He did much important pastoral work. He reformed the system of tithes and founded the sees of Mérida (Venezuela) and Cuenca (Quito). He was unsuccessful in founding a see at Antioquia and in placing the diocese of Panama under the jurisdiction of Bogotá (instead of Lima). Neither was he able to organize a provincial council of New Granada, as he had hoped.

== Revolt of the Comuneros ==
In 1780 the Revolt of the Comuneros broke out in the Viceroyalty of New Granada, almost at the same time as the revolt of Túpac Amaru in Viceroyalty of Perú. This was largely a reaction against the new system of taxes ordered by Charles III. To institute these reforms, the Crown sent Juan Francisco Gutiérrez de Piñeres to the colony in 1777, with the title of visitador (inspector). He established a tobacco monopoly, prohibiting its cultivation in certain regions, such as Socorro and Chiriquí Province. He set taxes on playing cards and aguardiente, organized the tax office, and set up customs offices in Cartagena and Bogotá.

The revolt began in Simacota, and included Mestizos, Criollos and Indigenous. About 20,000 men marched on the capital to demand the repeal of the new taxes, defeating colonial troops along the way. Viceroy Manuel Antonio Flórez had left the capital for Cartagena to defend against an expected attack there by the British. Visitador Gutiérrez de Piñeres was forced to flee before the Comuneros. The Audiencia and the archbishop formed a delegation to meet with the rebels. The meeting was held at Zipaquirá, only 60 km from the capital.

The rebels demanded the elimination of the new taxes and reductions in the old ones. Archbishop Caballero convinced the members of the Audiencia to accept all the terms. An agreement was reached on 7 June 1781, and the archbishop swore on the gospels to uphold it. The rebels dispersed. Nevertheless, once back in Bogotá the Audiencia and the archbishop repudiated the agreement. The Comuneros, now led by José Antonio Galán, rose again but with less success. They were violently suppressed, and their leaders captured and executed.

== Viceroy of New Granada ==
Viceroy Manuel Antonio Flórez resigned on 26 November 1781 and was replaced by Juan de Torrezar Díaz Pimienta, governor of Cartagena. However Torrezar died on 11 June 1782, only four days after arriving in the capital. A sealed letter opened after his death directed that the new interim Viceroy of New Granada should be Archbishop Caballero y Góngora.

It thus fell to Caballero to pacify the viceroyalty. He promulgated a pardon granted by the king, expanded and improved the colonial army, and sent Franciscan missionaries to the affected provinces to preach peace and obedience to the king. He also requested the Crown to abolish the recent reforms, including the creation of intendencias in the colony. New Granada become the only Spanish territory in the Americas where they were not established.

His efforts to modernize the viceroyalty were of great importance. He stimulated the economy, industry and the arts, and greatly assisted the Royal Botanical Expedition of 1783, under José Celestino Mutis. In 1782 and 1783 he had to deal with an epidemic of smallpox. In 1783 the interim character of his appointment was removed, and he became viceroy in his own right. In October 1784 he went to Cartagena to settle the Indian population in towns, and to suppress an Indigenous rebellion in Darién and promote colonization there. The latter project was not successful. He founded new missions in Casanare and San Martín.

In 1787 he asked to be relieved of his positions, and the king granted his request the following year.

In 1788 he was appointed bishop of Córdoba. He sailed for Spain in April 1789. In Córdoba, he founded the School of Fine Arts and donated his art collection to the city.

Antonio Caballero y Góngora died in Córdoba in 1796.

The genus Gongora, a type of orchid with most species found in Colombia, was named after him.

== Ancestors ==
16. Juan Fernández Caballero (1550-1627)
8. Juan Cristóbal Caballero Gómez (1611-1684)
17. Isabel Gómez
4. Juan Esteban Caballero y Espinar (1655-1724)
18. Caballero de Espinar
9. María y Espinar
19. Esposa del Caballero de Espinar
2. Juan Caballero y Espinar Alcalde de Priego de Córdoba (1681-1744)
20. Señor Ojeda
10. Caballero de Ojeda
21. Esposa del Señor Ojeda
5. Mariana de Ojeda
22. Desconocido
11. Esposa del Caballero de Ojeda
23. Desconocida
1. Antonio Caballero y Góngora. Virrey de Nueva Granada
24. Señor Góngora
12. Caballero de Góngora
25. Esposa del Señor Góngora
6. Francisco Javier de Góngora
26. Desconocido
13. Esposa del Caballero de Góngora
27. Desconocida
3. Ana Antonia de Góngora y Lara ( - 1753)
28. Señor Lara
14. Caballero de Lara
29. Esposa del Señor Lara
7. María Eugenia de Lara
30. Desconocido
15. Esposa del Caballero de Lara
31. Desconocida

== Citations ==
Government offices
Preceded by Juan de Torrezar Díaz Pimienta	Viceroy of New Granada; 1782–1789	Succeeded by Francisco Gil de Taboada
