= Revolt of the Comuneros (New Granada) =

Revolt in New Granada (modern Colombia) from 1781

The Revolt of the Comuneros was a popular uprising in the Viceroyalty of New Granada (now Colombia and parts of Venezuela) against the Spanish authorities from March through October 1781. The revolt was in reaction to the increase in taxation to raise funds for the defense of the region against the British and a rise in the price of tobacco and brandy. These were part of the late eighteenth-century Bourbon Reforms.

The initial revolt was local and not well known outside the region of Socorro, but in the late nineteenth century, historian Manuel Briceño saw the massive revolt as a precursor to independence. Prior to the 1781 revolt, residents in New Granada had protested, at times violently, against crown policy implementation there between 1740 and 1779.

== Background ==
Spain formally declared war on Britain on 21 June 1779, thus beginning the Anglo-Spanish War (1779–1783). In February 1782, Menorca fell to a combined French and Spanish fleet and with the capture of the Floridas, these constituted significant successes for Spain.

However, the largest effort was devoted to the Great Siege of Gibraltar (1779–1783), which even after three years made little progress despite enormous expenditures of both money and men. The imposition of heavy taxes and "voluntary" donations to pay for the war caused unrest in much of the Spanish Empire, including the 1781 Revolt of the Comuneros (New Granada) in New Granada. In the end, the Spanish siege of Gibraltar absorbed British resources that might otherwise have been used in the Americas but left them with little to show for their investment.

== Revolt ==
On March 16, 1781, in Socorro in northeastern Colombia, grocer Manuela Beltrán tore down posted edicts about new tax increases and other changes that would have reduced the profits of the colonists and enlarged the benefits of Spain. Many other towns in New Granada began to experience the same occurrences, with colonists livid about the conditions of the ruling government. Local residents began to assemble and elect a body of officials known as el común, or a central committee "to lead the movement."

The rebels unified under the leadership of Juan Francisco Berbeo, a Criollo elite. Despite coming from the upper classes of society, the rebels introduced the idea of unifying and organising the diverse social classes comprising common people. The endorsement of the elites improved the rebels' efforts to unify, as Berbeo consolidated 10,000 to 20,000 rebel troops to march on Bogotá, the capital. Once the rebels defeated the rival soldiers sent from Bogotá, they reached a town slightly north of it, where Spanish officials agreed to meet with the Comuneros and sign an agreement stating the conditions and complaints of the rebels.

However, once the rebels disbanded, the Spanish government officials signed a document that discarded the agreement on the grounds that it had been forced upon them. Once reinforcements for the Spanish government arrived, they were sent to rebellious cities and towns to enforce the implementation of the increased taxes. José Antonio Galán, one of the leaders of the revolt, continued on with a small number of rebels, including José Manuel Ortiz Manosalvas, but they were quickly defeated and executed, while other leaders of the rebellion were sentenced to life in prison for treason.

The influence of the revolt led to similar uprisings, with a similar outcome, as far north as Mérida and Timotes, now in Venezuela but at the time under the jurisdiction of the Viceroyalty of New Granada.

The city of Barinas defeated the Comuneros of the Venezuelan Andes (1781), a fact that led to King Carlos IV granting it the coat of arms in 1790 that the state capital retains today, along with the motto "very noble and very loyal".

== Interpretations of its causes ==
Many causes contributed to the revolt of 1781. Some were long-standing and related to the viceroyalty in New Granada in 1717. There is a debate among historians over what the main factor was, but what is clear is that the need for economic and political reform and as well the idea of self-government were contributors.

A series of reforms to the economy and government of the colonies, now called the Bourbon Reforms, are believed to be a factor. As the population and economy of the New World began to outgrow that of Spain, Spain sought ways to make the colonies more profitable. The Spanish government aimed to eliminate tax evasion to reduce benefits to the colonies, and created new laws and taxes to establish greater support and larger revenue for the home country.

Spain also established trading companies, allowed for agricultural and industrial "royal monopolies" and encouraged a greater amount of imports to the colonies to decrease the manufacturing capability of the colonies. These economic and social reforms increased the limitations for colonists to produce crops and changed their economy.

Another factor considered by scholars is the major political reforms that the Spanish government forced on the colonies. In order for Spain to benefit economically from the colonies, it needed stricter control over their government. These political changes were also part of the Bourbon Reforms. Some historians such as Brian Hamnett believe that it was the age-old battle between "absolutism versus the unwritten constitution" of New Granada that spurred on the colonists. He believes that the imperialism of the Spanish home country and its dependence upon the colonies contributed to the need of the colonies' "decentralization." In a review of John Leddy Phelan's book on the Comunero revolt, Hamnett states that the revolt was started, not with the goal of an independence movement, political freedom and self-government, but only with the hope of reversing the reforms.

== Associated people ==
- Antonio Caballero y Góngora
- José Antonio Galán
- José Alfonso Pizarro
- Juan José García de Hevia
- Juan de Torrezar Díaz Pimienta
- Manuela Beltrán

== See also ==
- Comunero
- Inconfidência Mineira
- Rebellion of Túpac Amaru II (coeval revolt in Peru caused by the Bourbon Reforms)

== External sources ==
- “Bourdon Reforms.” World History: The Modern Era. ABC-CLIO, n.d. Accessed 29 January 2010.
- “Comunero Revolt.” World History: The Modern Era. ABC-CLIO, n.d. Accessed 29 January 2010.
