= Mishkino =

Mishkino (Russian: Мишкино) is the name of several inhabited localities in Russia.

Urban localities

- Mishkino, Kurgan Oblast, an urban-type settlement in Mishkinsky District of Kurgan Oblast

Rural localities

- Mishkino, Baltachevsky District, Republic of Bashkortostan, a village in Yalangachevsky Selsoviet of Baltachevsky District of the Republic of Bashkortostan
- Mishkino, Mishkinsky District, Republic of Bashkortostan, a selo in Mishkinsky Selsoviet of Mishkinsky District of the Republic of Bashkortostan
- Mishkino, Uchalinsky District, Republic of Bashkortostan, a village in Nauruzovsky Selsoviet of Uchalinsky District of the Republic of Bashkortostan
- Mishkino, Kaliningrad Oblast, a settlement in Mayakovsky Rural Okrug of Gusevsky District of Kaliningrad Oblast
- Mishkino, Leningrad Oblast, a village under the administrative jurisdiction of Krasnoborskoye Settlement Municipal Formation, Tosnensky District, Leningrad Oblast
- Mishkino, Mari El Republic, a village in Usolinsky Rural Okrug of Gornomariysky District of the Mari El Republic
- Mishkino, Perm Krai, a village under the administrative jurisdiction of the city of krai significance of Krasnokamsk, Perm Krai
- Mishkino, Pskov Oblast, a village in Porkhovsky District of Pskov Oblast
- Mishkino, Grakhovsky District, Udmurt Republic, a village in Verkhneigrinsky Selsoviet of Grakhovsky District of the Udmurt Republic
- Mishkino, Sharkansky District, Udmurt Republic, a selo in Mishkinsky Selsoviet of Sharkansky District of the Udmurt Republic
