= Blue Division =

Unit of Spanish volunteers in the German Wehrmacht during World War II

250th Infantry Division ("Blue Division")
- 250.ª División de Infantería ("División Azul"); 250. Infanterie-Division ("Blaue Division")
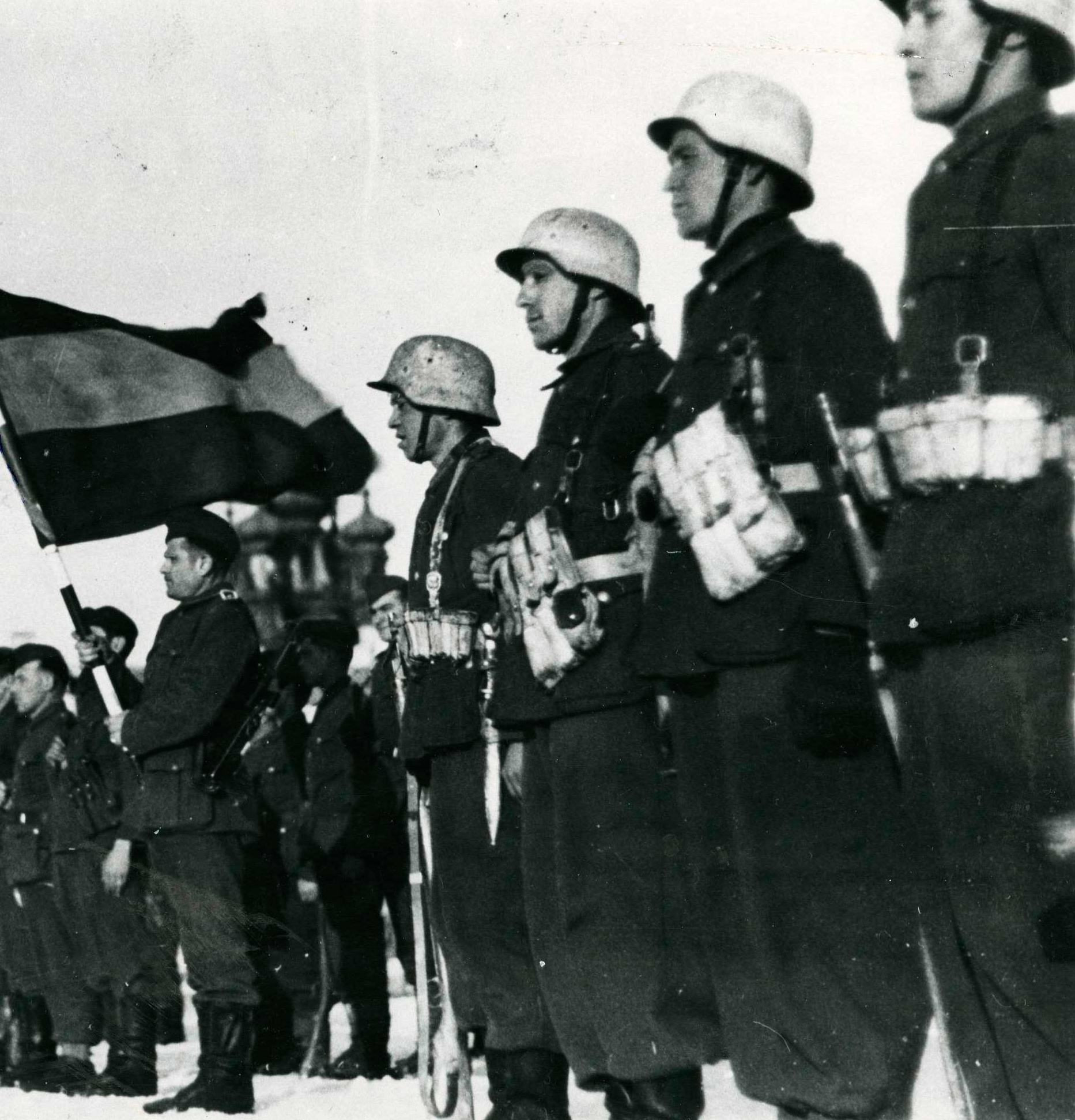
- Volunteers from the Blue Division
- Active: 24 June 1941 – 10 October 1943
- Country: Spain
- Allegiance: Germany
- Branch: German Army
- Type: Infantry
- Size: 18,000 troops (1941); 45,000 troops (total, 1941–44)
- Nickname: Blue Division
- Engagements: World War II; Eastern Front; Siege of Leningrad; Battle of the Volkhov; Lake Ilmen Engagement; Battle of Krasny Bor

Commanders
- Notable commanders: Agustín Muñoz Grandes; Emilio Esteban Infantes

Insignia
- Sleeve insignias

The 250th Infantry Division (German: 250. Infanterie-Division), better known as the Blue Division (Spanish: División Azul; German: Blaue Division), was a unit of volunteers from Francoist Spain operating from 1941 to 1943 within the German Army (Heer) on the Eastern Front during World War II. It was officially designated the Spanish Volunteer Division (División Española de Voluntarios) by the Spanish Army.

Francisco Franco had secured power in Spain after the Nationalist victory in the Spanish Civil War (1936–1939), during which the Nationalists received support from Nazi Germany. Franco's authoritarian regime remained officially non-belligerent in World War II but sympathised with the Axis powers. After lobbying by the Spanish Foreign Minister Ramón Serrano Suñer and by senior figures within the Spanish Army following the 22 June 1941 launch of Operation Barbarossa, Franco agreed that Spanish people would be permitted to enlist privately in the German Army and undertook to provide tacit support. An infantry division was raised from Falangist and Spanish Army cadres and was sent for training in Germany. The unit fought on the Eastern Front, in the 1941–1944 siege of Leningrad, notably in the Battle of Krasny Bor. They eventually withdrew from the front after Allied political pressure on Spain in October 1943 and returned to Spain shortly afterwards. Several thousand non-returners were incorporated into the 121st Infantry Division, the short-lived Blue Legion, and eventually into the Waffen-SS.

== Background ==
Francisco Franco took power at the head of a coalition of fascist, monarchist, and conservative political factions in the Spanish Civil War (1936–1939) against the left-leaning Spanish government supported by communist and anarchist factions. More than 300,000 people were killed, and lasting damage was done to the country's economy.

While Spain formally remained neutral, it did not hide its ideological support for the Axis powers. Franco had been supported by Nazi Germany and Fascist Italy during the Civil War and Franco sympathised with many aspects of fascist ideology, especially its anti-communism. On the other side, the Republican army had been supported by Soviet aid. More importantly, Franco seriously contemplated joining the Axis Powers in the aftermath of the Fall of France in 1940. He met Adolf Hitler on 23–24 October 1940 at Hendaye to discuss Spanish belligerency but was unable to gain promises that Spain would gain colonial territories from France in North Africa. Hitler feared delegitimizing the new Vichy regime in France.

== Formation ==
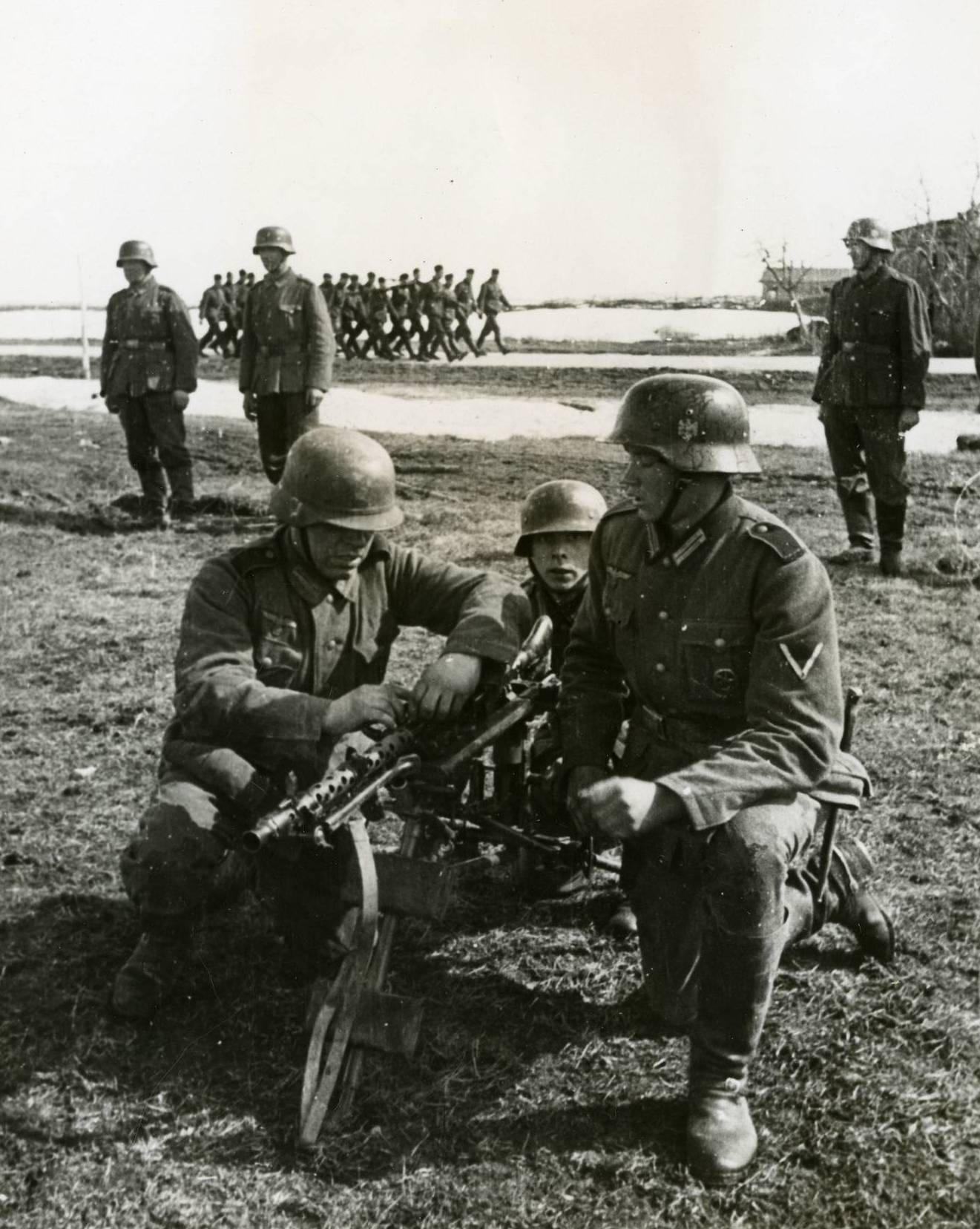
Blue Division soldiers manning a gun during training in 1941

The German invasion of the Soviet Union led to renewed interest in participating in what Spanish officials saw as an "anti-communist crusade". Within hours of the invasion on 22 June 1941, Foreign Minister Ramón Serrano Suñer first proposed to Franco the idea of a Spanish contribution, publicly declaring the Soviet Union guilty of the Spanish Civil War. Senior officers of the Spanish Army supported the proposal. Franco soon agreed to the proposal, directing that the Spanish Army should unofficially co-ordinate the formation of the unit. Although disappointed that Spain had not declared war on the Soviet Union, the German regime accepted the Spanish offer on 24 June 1941. Franco struggled to balance the demands of the Spanish Army and Falangist factions, both of which attempted to influence the new unit, himself siding with the former.

Recruitment began on 27 June 1941 and 18,373 men had volunteered by 2 July 1941 from within the Spanish Army and Falangist movement. Fifty per cent of officers and NCOs were professional soldiers given leave from the Spanish Army, including many veterans of the Spanish Civil War. The division was made up mainly of Falangist volunteers and almost a fifth of early volunteers were students. Additionally, the division contained a small number of White émigrés from Spain. General Agustín Muñoz Grandes was assigned to lead the volunteers. Because the soldiers could not use official Spanish Army uniforms, they adopted a symbolic uniform comprising the red berets of the Carlists, the khaki trousers of the Spanish Legion, and the blue shirts of the Falangists—hence the nickname "Blue Division." This uniform was used only while on leave in Spain; in the field, soldiers wore the German Army field grey uniform (Feldgrau) with a shield on the upper right sleeve bearing the word "España" (Spanish for "Spain") and the Nationalist Spanish national colours.

== Operational history ==
=== Organization and training ===
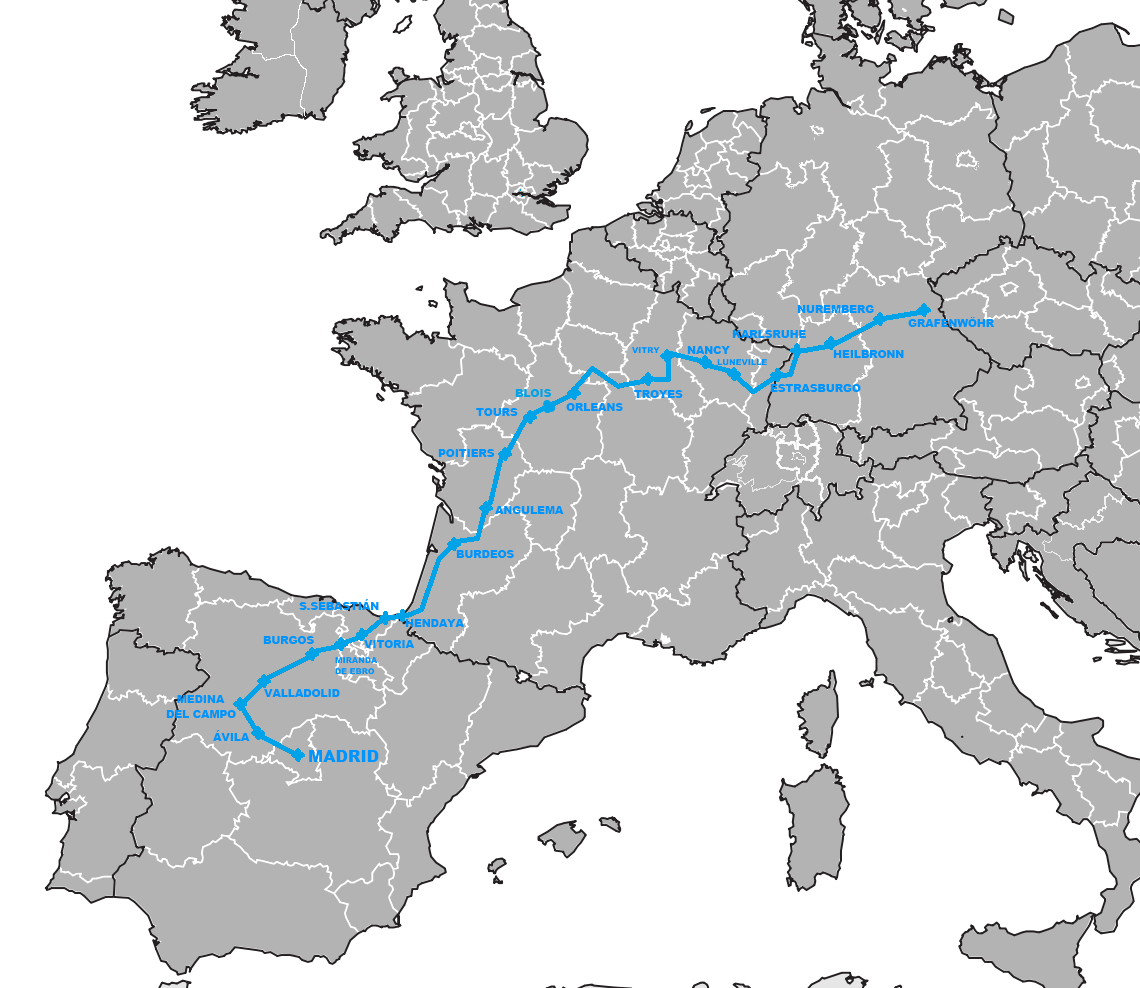
The train trip from Madrid to Grafenwöhr

On 13 July 1941 the first train left Madrid for Grafenwöhr, Bavaria for a further five weeks of training. There they became the German Army's 250th Infantry Division and were initially divided into four infantry regiments, as in a standard Spanish division. To aid their integration into the German supply system, they soon adopted the standard German model of three regiments. One of the original regiments was dispersed amongst the others, which were then named after three of the Spanish cities that volunteers largely originated from—Madrid, Valencia and Seville. Each regiment had three battalions (of four companies each) and two weapons companies, supported by an artillery regiment of four battalions (of three batteries each). There were enough men left over to create an assault battalion, mainly armed with submachine guns. Later, due to casualties, this unit was disbanded. Aviator volunteers formed a Blue Squadron (Escuadrillas Azules) which, using Messerschmitt Bf 109s and Focke-Wulf Fw 190s, claimed to have shot down 156 Soviet aircraft.

=== Eastern Front ===
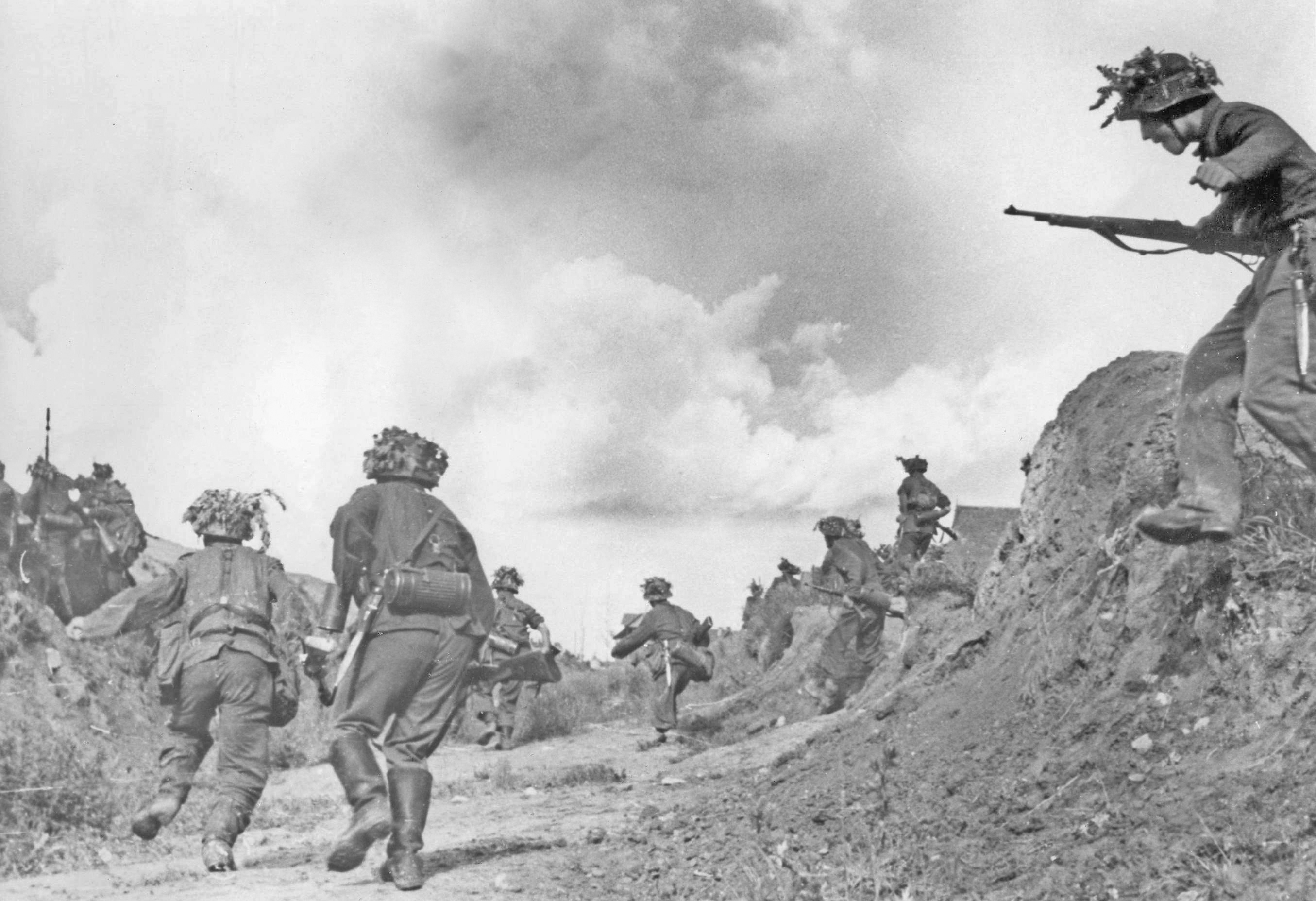
Division's soldiers at the siege of Leningrad in 1943

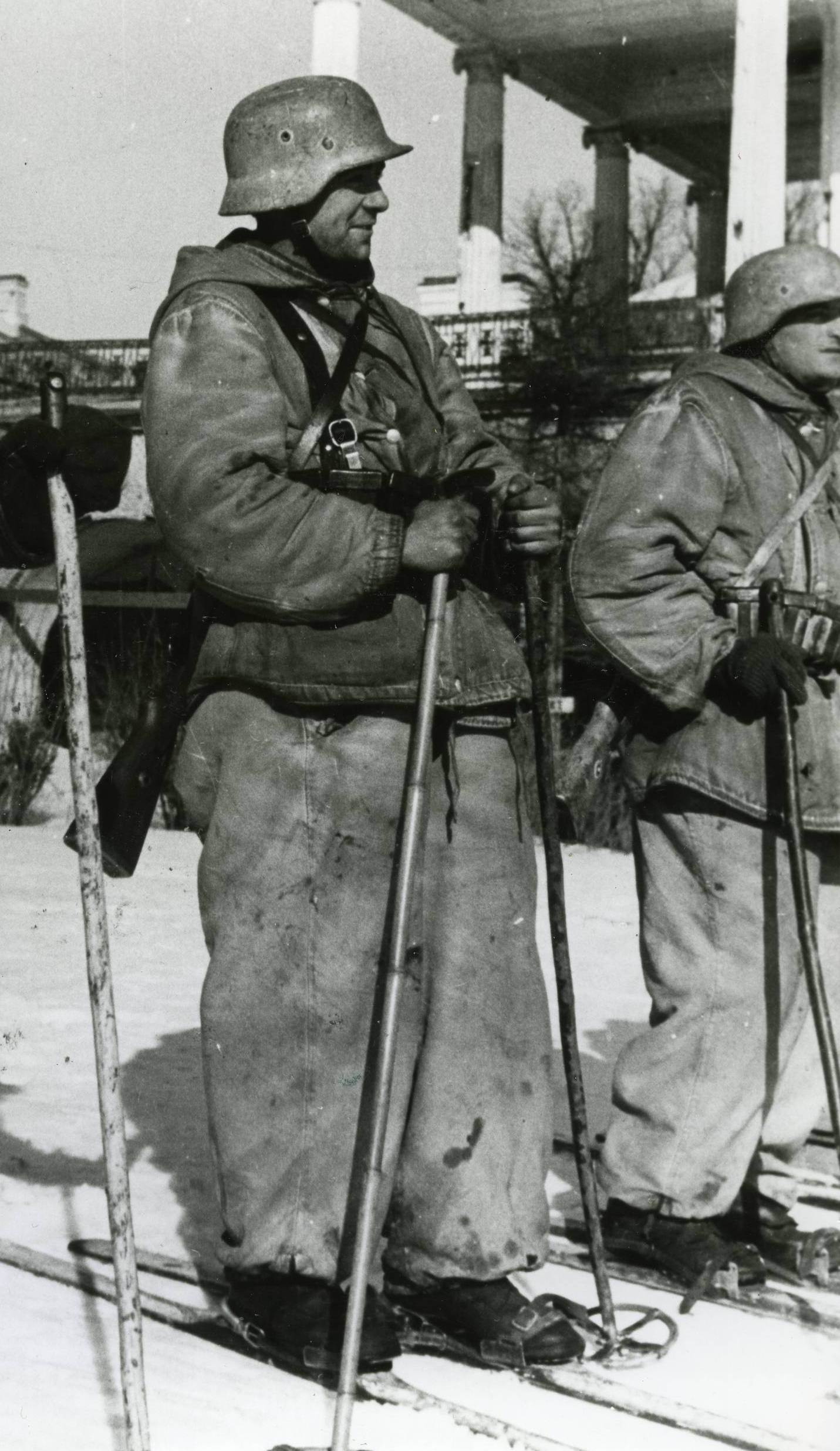
Soldiers of the Blue Division in skis in 1942 near the Volkhov

On 31 July, after taking the Hitler Oath, the Blue Division was formally incorporated into the German Wehrmacht as the 250th Division. It was initially assigned to Army Group Center, the force advancing towards Moscow. The division was transported by train to Suwałki, Poland (August 28), from where it had to continue by foot on a 900-kilometre (560 mi) march. It was scheduled to travel through Grodno, and Lida in Belarus, Vilnius (Lithuania), and Maladzyechna, Minsk, and Orsha in Belarus to Smolensk, and from there to the Moscow front. While marching towards the Smolensk front on September 26, the Spanish volunteers were rerouted from Vitebsk and reassigned to Army Group North (the force closing on Leningrad), becoming part of the German 16th Army. The Blue Division was first deployed on the Volkhov River front, with its headquarters in Grigorovo, on the outskirts of Novgorod. It was in charge of a 50-kilometre (31 mi) section of the front north and south of Novgorod, along the banks of the Volkhov River and Lake Ilmen.

The division's soldiers used the iconostasis of the Church of Saint Theodore Stratelates on the Brook for firewood. The iconostases of the Cathedral of St. Sophia, Sts. Peter and Paul Church in Kozhevniki, and the Cathedral of the Nativity of the Mother of God in the Antoniev Monastery were taken to Germany at the end of 1943. According to the museum curator in the Church of the Transfiguration on Ilyina Street, the division used the high cupola as a machine-gun nest. As a result, much of the building was seriously damaged, including many of the medieval icons by Theophanes the Greek. Vladimir Kovalevskii, one of the division's White Russian emigre interpreters, left a particularly acerbic memoir account describing the low discipline and the crimes committed by the Spanish volunteers.

In August 1942, the Blue Division was transferred north to the southeastern flank of the siege of Leningrad, just south of the Neva River near Pushkin, Kolpino and Krasny Bor in the Izhora River area. After the collapse of the German southern front following the Battle of Stalingrad, more German troops were deployed southwards. By this time, General Emilio Esteban Infantes had taken command. The Blue Division faced a major Soviet attempt to break the siege of Leningrad in February 1943, when the Soviet 55th Army, reinvigorated after the victory at Stalingrad, attacked the Spanish positions at the Battle of Krasny Bor, near the main Moscow-Leningrad road. Despite very heavy casualties, the Spaniards were able to hold their ground against a Soviet force seven times larger and supported by tanks. The assault was contained and the siege of Leningrad was maintained for a further year. The division remained on the Leningrad front where it continued to suffer heavy casualties due to weather and to enemy action.

The Blue Division was the only component of the German Army to be awarded a medal of its own, commissioned by Hitler in January 1944 after the Division had demonstrated its effectiveness in impeding the advance of the Red Army. Hitler referred to the division as "equal to the best German ones". During his table talks, he said: "...the Spaniards have never yielded an inch of ground. One can't imagine more fearless fellows. They scarcely take cover. They flout death. I know, in any case, that our men are always glad to have Spaniards as neighbours in their sector".

=== Disbandment and the Blue Legion ===
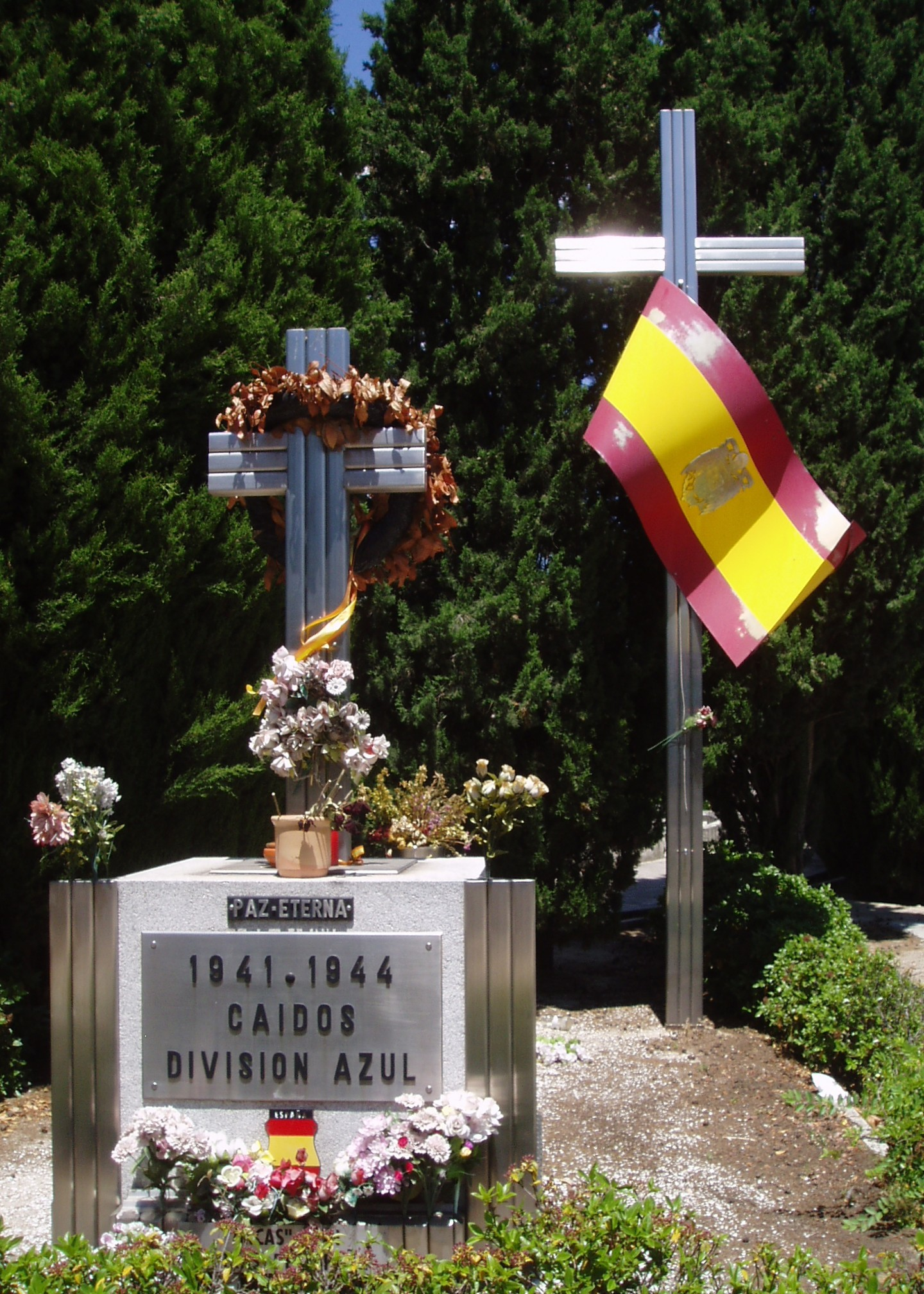
Vault of the Blue Division, in La Almudena cemetery, Madrid

Eventually, the Allies and many Spaniards began to press Franco to withdraw troops from the quasi alliance with Germany. Franco initiated negotiations in the spring of 1943 and gave an order to withdraw on October 10 but some Spanish volunteers refused to return. On 3 November 1943 the Spanish government ordered all troops to return to Spain. In the end, the total of "non-returners" was close to 3,000 men, mostly Falangists. Spaniards also joined other German units, and fresh volunteers slipped across the Spanish border near Lourdes in occupied France. The new pro-German Spanish units were collectively called the Legión Azul ("Blue Legion").

Spaniards initially remained part of the 121st Infantry Division, but even this meagre force was ordered to return home in March 1944, and was transported back to Spain on March 21. The rest of the volunteers were absorbed into German units. Platoons of Spaniards served in the 3rd Mountain Division and the 357th Infantry Division. One unit was sent to Latvia. Two companies joined the Brandenburger Regiment and the 121st Division in Nazi security warfare in Yugoslavia. The 101st Company (Spanische-Freiwilligen Kompanie der SS 101, "Spanish Volunteer Company of the SS Number 101") of 140 men, made up of four rifle platoons and one staff platoon, was attached to 28th SS Volunteer Grenadier Division Wallonien.

Through rotation, as many as 45,000 Spanish soldiers served on the Eastern Front. The casualties of the Blue Division and its successors included 4,954 men killed and 8,700 wounded. Another 372 members of the Blue Division, the Blue Legion, or volunteers of the Spanische-Freiwilligen Kompanie der SS 101 were taken prisoner by the Red Army; 286 of these men remained in captivity until 2 April 1954, when they returned to Spain aboard the ship Semiramis, supplied by the International Red Cross. In action against the Red Army, the Blue Division suffered 22,700 casualties, while inflicting 49,300 casualties.

== After the war ==
Hundreds of Blue Division prisoners of war were held by the Soviet authorities. While most prisoners from other nations would be repatriated after the war, Francoist Spain and the Soviet Union did not have diplomatic relations. Soviet camps held together staunch anti-Communist prisoners, those who collaborated with the Soviets either by their previous hidden ideology or after captivity and even those Republican sailors whose Spanish ships had been requisitioned after the fall of the Republic. In 1954, after the death of Stalin, the French Red Cross arranged the ship Semiramis to bring those prisoners who desired repatriation to Barcelona.

== Portuguese volunteers ==
Like Spain, Portugal under the Salazar regime remained neutral during World War II in agreement with the United Kingdom in accordance to the Anglo-Portuguese Treaty of 1373 and more openly sympathized with the Western Allies. There was some popular anti-communist sentiment, and 150 Portuguese volunteers served unofficially in the Blue Division. However, most had roots in Spain or had already fought on the Francoist side in the Viriatos Division during the Spanish Civil War. The Portuguese served in Spanish units and had no separate national presence.

== War cemetery ==
1,900 soldiers of the Blue Division are buried in the war cemetery in Veliky Novgorod, Russia.

== See also ==
- Spain in World War II
- List of Girls und Panzer characters#Blue Division High School, a school in Girls und Panzer named after the Blue Division
