= Battle of Krasny =

Battle of Krasny may refer to:

- Battle of Krasny Bor, a battle in 1943 to relieve the siege of Leningrad
- Battle of Krasnoi (Krasny), a series of skirmishes in November 1812, during Napoleon's retreat from Moscow.
