= Emilio Esteban Infantes =

Spanish general (1892–1962)

Emilio Esteban-Infantes
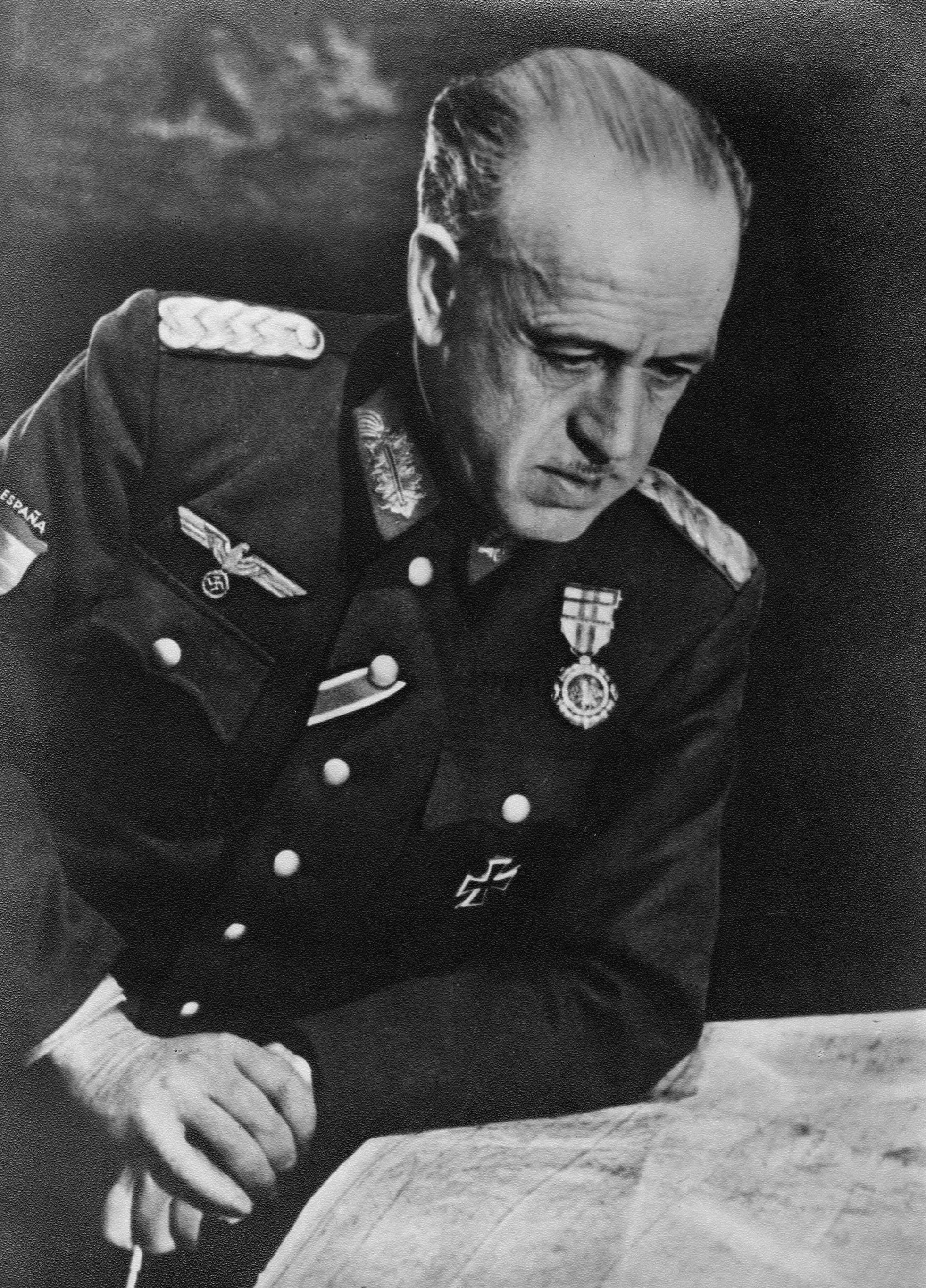
- General Esteban Infantes as an officer of the Wehrmacht, 1943
- Born: Emilio Esteban-Infantes Martín; 18 May 1892; Toledo, Spain
- Died: 6 September 1962 (aged 70); Gijón, Spain
- Military career
- Allegiance: Kingdom of Spain (1915–1931); Spanish Republic (1931–1936); Spanish State (1936–1958); Nazi Germany (1942–1943)
- Branch: Spanish Army; German Army (Wehrmacht)
- Service years: 1915–1942, 1943–1958 (Spain); 1942–1943 (Germany)
- Rank: General
- Commands: Blue Division
- Conflicts: Rif War; Spanish Civil War Battle of Teruel; World War II Battle of Krasny Bor
- Awards: Knight's Cross of the Iron Cross; Medalla Militar; German Cross

Emilio Esteban-Infantes Martín (18 May 1892 – 6 September 1962) was a Spanish officer who served during the Spanish Civil War, and later in World War II as commander of the Blue Division (Spanish: División Azul, German: Blaue Division), or the 250th Infantry Division of the German Wehrmacht. He was a recipient of the Knight's Cross of the Iron Cross of Nazi Germany.

== Early career ==
Infantes was born in Toledo on 18 May 1892. In 1907, aged 15, he entered the Toledo Infantry Academy where his classmates included Francisco Franco and Juan Yagüe. Graduating in 1910, he was commissioned as a lieutenant and was sent to join the Spanish African Army in Morocco. In 1912, at only 20 years of age, he received a meritorious promotion to captain during combat activity in the prolonged Rif War which lasted from 1909 to 1927. By 1928 he had achieved the rank of lieutenant colonel and in that year, following the end of the Moroccan war, was appointed a professor at the General Military Academy in Zaragoza by its new director, General Francisco Franco.

== Spanish Civil War ==
He was in Madrid on 17 July 1936 when the military insurrection against the Republican government began and had to quickly escape to Burgos, where he joined the Nationalist forces under Franco. As a result, he was sentenced to death in absentia by the Republican government. During the war, he held various major military appointments including chief of general staff of the Castilian Army Corps during the Brunete offensive in July 1937 and the subsequent Battle of Teruel between December 1937 and February 1938. He then took over as colonel in command of the 5th Division of Navarre and received the Military Medal for his contribution to the ultimate success and victory of the Nationalist forces. In May 1940, a year after the civil war had ended, he was promoted to brigadier-general in command of the Army General Staff of Morocco and Military Region IV.

== Second World War ==
After Hitler launched Operation Barbarossa against the Soviet Union in June 1941, Franco's government authorized the dispatch of a volunteer Spanish division under the overall command of the German Wehrmacht. This became the 250th Infantry Division (popularly known "Blue Division"), initially commanded by General Agustín Muñoz Grandes. The division was deployed within Army Group North under the overall command of Generalfeldmarschall Wilhelm Ritter von Leeb, and engaged in several battles against the Red Army near Leningrad. However, despite being popular with his soldiers, Muñoz Grandes behavior began to show too much of a "pro-German slant" for Franco who, even in mid-1942, was preoccupied with the general direction and possible outcome of the war.

Esteban Infantes was close friend of the Minister of War, General José Enrique Varela, and for several months he had been pressing for a transfer to a combat role with the Blue Division. However, Varela knew that there was only room for one brigade general and therefore Esteban Infantes could only be sent to the war zone in the Soviet Union as the commander of the division. The issue was finally resolved by Franco, who knew him well as a former colleague at both the Toledo and Zaragoza Academies. Franco viewed Esteban Infantes as a more moderate and diplomatic option compared to the more controversial Muñoz Grandes. Consequently, Esteban Infantes was dispatched to Germany where he was inducted into the Wehrmacht with the rank of Generalmajor and with the military oath being administered directly to Hitler at the Berghof.

In December 1942, Esteban Infantes formally took command of the Blue Division. He faced a difficult situation replacing such a legendary and popular commander as Muñoz Grandes. The German generals also initially considered him to be too anglophile in his outlook but Esteban Infantes soon won their respect as he began to demonstrate his considerable skill as a great military planner especially in more counter-offensive situations that developed on the Eastern Front during 1943.

Esteban Infantes faced a major Soviet attempt to break the siege of Leningrad in February 1943, when the 55th Soviet Army, reinvigorated after the Soviet victory at Stalingrad, attacked the Spanish positions at the Battle of Krasny Bor, near the main Moscow-Leningrad road. Despite heavy casualties, the Spaniards were able to hold their ground against a Russian force seven times larger and supported by tanks. The assault was contained and the siege of Leningrad was maintained for a further year. This victory established the reputation of Esteban Infantes both with his own soldiers and with the German general staff. The commander of 18th Army, Generaloberst Georg Lindemann, came to visit him and to congratulate him on this great feat. He was promoted to Generalleutnant and awarded the German Cross in Gold. On 3 October 1943 he was finally also awarded the Knight's Cross of the Iron Cross.

After this, due to the course that the war was taking, Franco decided to withdraw the Blue Division and replace it with the smaller Blue Legion. Esteban Infantes was responsible for the establishment of this smaller unit before handing the command over to Oberst Antonio García Navarro. He then returned to Spain in December 1943, where he was promoted to lieutenant general and given command of Military Region IX.

== Later career ==
After the war he occupied various posts including president of the Supreme Council of Military Justice, commander of the VII Military Region and head of Franco's military household before finishing his career as Chief of Central General Staff. He published his memoirs in 1958: "Blue Division: Spanish Volunteers in the Eastern Front." He reaffirmed how proud he was to have participated in the Russian campaign and said that it served to counter the poor history of foreign Spanish military campaigns during the 19th century. His motto was: "Fighting is our glory! Our thought: Spain."

He died at home in Gijón on 6 September 1962, aged 70, after a long illness.

Military offices
Preceded by Agustín Muñoz Grandes	Commander of the Blue Division; 13 December 1942 – 20 October 1943	Command abolished
Preceded by Fernando Barrón	Chief of Staff of the Army; 9 November 1952 – 5 October 1955	Succeeded by Antonio Alcubilla Pérez
