= Battle of Krasny Bor =

Attempt by Soviet forces to end the siege of Leningrad in February 1943

Coordinates: 59°40′47″N 30°40′10″E

- Part of the Eastern Front of World War II, and the Siege of Leningrad
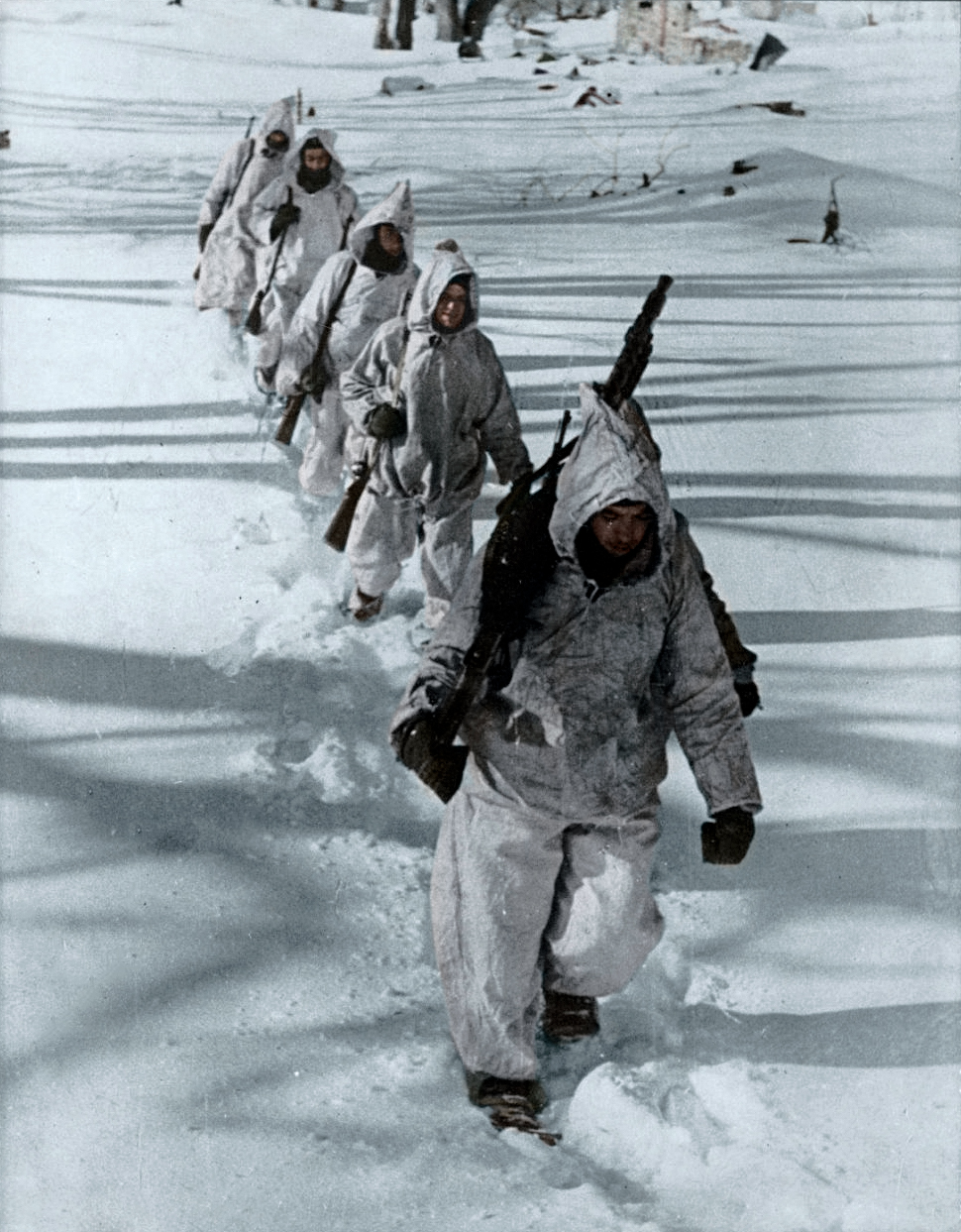
- Colorized photo of the 250th Infantry Blue Division near Krasny Bor.
Date	9–13 February 1943
Location	Krasny Bor, near present-day Saint Petersburg, Russia
Result	Axis victory

Belligerents
Germany	Soviet Union

Commanders and leaders
Georg Lindemann; Emilio Esteban Infantes	Vladimir Sviridov; Leonid Govorov; Kliment Voroshilov

Units involved
(Nazi Germany) 18th Army: 250th Division (Francoist Spain volunteer division); 4th SS Division (initially); 24th Division; elements from 7 divisions (reinforcements)	(Soviet Union) 55th Army: 43rd Division; 45th Guards Division; 63rd Guards Division; 34th Ski Brigade; Mobile group: 35th Ski Brigade; 122nd Tank Brigade

Strength
Initially: 250th: 4,900 infantry; 4th SS: uncertain	33,000 infantry 30 tanks 1,000 artillery pieces (Initially) Total: 43,000 infantry 90 tanks

Casualties and losses
3,645 killed & wounded 300 missing (250th Infantry Division)	13,563 casualties 6,572 injured

The Battle of Krasny Bor was part of the Soviet offensive Operation Polyarnaya Zvezda in the Eastern Front of World War II. It called for a pincer attack near Leningrad to build on the success of Operation Iskra and completely lift the siege of Leningrad, in the process encircling a substantial part of the German 18th Army. The offensive near the town of Krasny Bor formed the western arm of the pincer. The Soviet offensive began on Wednesday, 10 February 1943, and produced noticeable gains on the first day but rapidly became a stalemate. The strong defense by the Spanish Blue Division and the German SS Polizei Division gave the German forces time to reinforce their positions. By February 13, the Soviet forces had ceased their offensive in this sector.

== Background ==
=== The siege of Leningrad ===
The siege of Leningrad began in early autumn 1941. By September 8, German and Finnish forces had surrounded the city and cut all supply routes to Leningrad and its suburbs. However, the original drive on the city failed, and the attack became a siege. During 1942 the Soviets made attempts to breach the blockade, but all were unsuccessful. The last such endeavour in 1942 was the Sinyavino Offensive. After the defeat of that effort, the front line returned to what it was previously and again 16 kilometres (9.9 mi) separated Leonid Govorov's Leningrad Front in the city and Kirill Meretskov's Volkhov Front.

Despite the failures of earlier operations, lifting the siege of Leningrad was a very high priority, so new offensive preparations began in November 1942, only weeks after the last offensive failed. In December, the operational plan was approved by the STAVKA (the Soviet High Command) and received the codename "Iskra" (Spark). By January 1943, the situation looked very good for the Soviet side. The German defeat at Stalingrad had weakened the German front. The Soviet forces were planning or conducting offensive operations across the entire front, especially in southern Russia. Amidst these conditions, "Iskra" was to become the first of several offensive operations aimed at inflicting a decisive defeat on Army Group North.

Operation Iskra was a strategic victory for the Soviet forces and successfully opened a land corridor 8–10 km wide into the city. A railroad was swiftly built through it and allowed many more supplies to reach the city than the "Road of Life" (the truck route across the frozen Lake Ladoga), eliminating the possibility of the capture of the city and a German-Finnish linkup. At the same time, however, STAVKA knew that "Iskra" was incomplete as the corridor it had opened was narrow and was still in range of German artillery. Additionally, the important heights and strong point at Siniavino were still controlled by the Germans. This led Georgy Zhukov, the Soviet commander, to plan a much more ambitious offensive operation named Operation Polyarnaya Zvezda ("Polar Star").

=== Operation Polyarnaya Zvezda ===
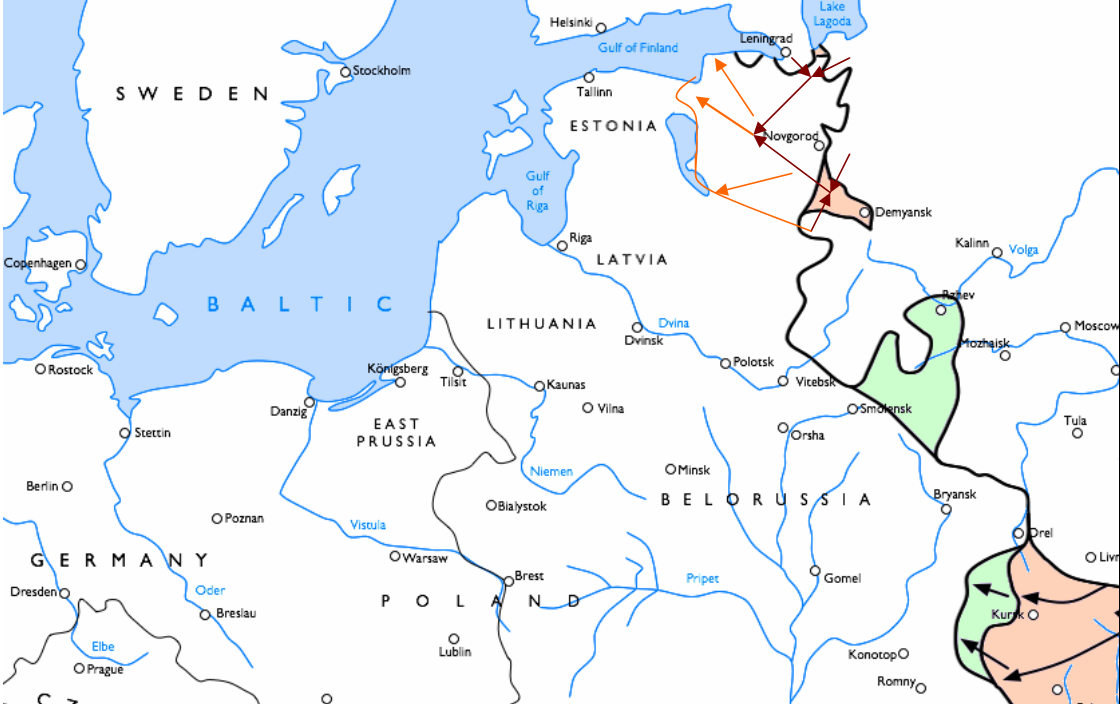
Soviet plan for Operation Polyarnaya Zvezda in the context of the wider offensive in the northern and central parts of the front

Operation Polyarnaya Zvezda tried to build on the success of Operation Iskra and began only days later. Zhukov, who had overseen Iskra, was promoted to marshal of the Soviet Union on January 18, the day the two Soviet Fronts linked up and broke the blockade. This foresaw a three-front attack by the Northwestern Front [roughly equivalent to an army group], under Marshal Semyon Timoshenko; the Volkhov Front under Colonel General Kirill Meretskov, and the Leningrad Front under Colonel General Leonid Govorov, of which the 55th Army was now a part. The Northwestern Front was to attack the Ramushevo Corridor, which connected the Demyansk Salient, held by the Germans to their main positions since 1942. The destruction of the bulk of the German 16th Army in the pocket would allow the Front to exploit the gap in the German lines. The Leningrad and Volkov Fronts were to capitalize on the fact that the German 18th Army was stretched very thin in the January fighting and attack the army's flanks, aiming to link up near Tosno. Again, this would create a gap in the German lines. Overall, the goal of the offensive was nothing short of decisively defeating Army Group North and advancing to Lake Chud.

The 55th Army's objective was to break open the vital Leningrad-Moscow Highway, starting from its jump-off position in Kolpino towards Tosno; it was to join up with a northbound pincer attack of the 54th Army of the Volkhov Front, thereby encircling German formations in the Mga sector. The highway is an important road/railway connection linking Moscow and Leningrad. The pivot point for this highway was Krasny Bor, situated between the highway and the railway line. 55th Army's attack would also hit sectors defended by other German formations which were established to secure flanks and draw them into battle. Once this attack had succeeded, the plan was for the second echelon forces to advance through the gap towards Tosno. The attack was planned for 10 February 1943, and was to jump off from Kolpino. The 55th Army planned to attack with a force of approximately 33,000 men and 30 tanks in first echelon, to be followed by a mobile group consisting of the 122nd Tank Brigade and the 35th Ski Brigade.

== The battle ==
=== February 10 – day 1 ===
On Wednesday, February 10, 1943, a massive artillery bombardment of 1,000 Soviet guns and mortars descended on the Spanish lines at precisely 6:45. Shells, mortars and Katyusha rockets pounded the trenches, bunkers and dugouts which had been constructed to strengthen the eastern flank of Army Group North. At 8.45 hours, the bombardment shifted from the front line onto Krasny Bor itself, also striking the villages of Podolvo and Raikelevo (located west and southwest of Krasny Bor, respectively), the latter being the location of Infantes' forward command post.

At approximately 8:40, the 45th and 63rd Guards and the 72nd Rifle Divisions, followed by some tanks, advanced towards Staraia Mysa (west of Krasny Bor), Krasny Bor, Raikelevo and Podolvo, with the 63rd Guards Rifle Division facing the 4,900 troops of the 250th Infantry Division (The Spanish Blue Division), holding the eastern flank of the line. Pinned down by two hours of initial bombardment, Spanish formations were unable to retreat towards the town and in many cases fought to the death. The frontline was quickly overrun, and many Spanish formations were destroyed there.

Inside Krasny Bor, a company of the 250th Infantry Division held the October Railway station, repulsing infantry charges and three tank assaults by advancing Soviet forces. By 11:00 the company was reduced to 40 Spanish combatants, yet these managed to hold the factory until 12:00, when they fell back into the town. From 9:00 to 10:40, isolated Spanish units fought off Soviet attacks but were cut off when the Soviets seized the October Railway. Now encircled, the units still holding the Leningrad-Moscow Highway decided to hold-on as long as possible and were destroyed in combat.

The 55th Army, in the meantime, had advanced despite heavy casualties inflicted by the dug-in Spanish troops. The Soviets took Raikelevo, which cut off Podolvo from Krasny Bor. In Krasny Bor itself the Spanish artillery, engineers and other assorted stragglers came under attack from Soviet infantry and armour, and by 12:00, the 63rd Guards Rifle Division reported the capture of Krasny Bor, despite the fact that the southern half of the town was still controlled by the Spanish. Soviet tanks opened fire on a hospital and retreating ambulances but were eventually beaten off by Spanish troops armed with Molotov cocktails and hand grenades. The afternoon brought belated support for the defenders in the form of a Luftwaffe fighter-bomber attack on the Soviet positions around the town of Kolpino, to the north of Krasny Bor, while the 45th Guards Rifle Division seized Mishkino. Sviridov decided to insert the mobile group into the battle late on the day, but they were stopped by a combination of fierce resistance and a sudden thaw that stopped the Ski Brigade from operating off-road. The German command reinforced the Spanish defenses with battle groups.

The 63rd Guards Rifle Division advanced as far as the central-western part of the town, and after 15:15 managed to push a small formation into the rear of the Spanish division's forward command post. Meanwhile, the remaining Spanish troops were ordered to new positions on the Izhora River, to the west of the town. Here they held out against 63rd Guards Rifle Division's last attacks of the day.

After 16:30 hours a battle group of the German 212th Infantry Division and two companies each of the Flemish and the Latvian Legions were able to support the Spanish with a counter-attack on the forest at Staraya Rechka, and by taking over the frontline from the highway to the Izhora River. Elements of the 212th relieved the Spanish troops still holding the southern half of Krasny Bor.

At the end of the day, the 63rd Guards Rifle Division had advanced four or five kilometres and captured Krasny Bor, Mishkino, Staraya Mirza, Stepanovka, and Popovka Station. On its left wing, the attack by the 43rd Rifle Division and the 34th Ski Brigade had had initial success, driving the 4th SS Police Division into the Tosno River.

In the Ishora River sector, the 72nd Rifle Division pushed back the lines of the Spanish towards the river, destroying the Field Replacement Battalion, but suffering up to 70% casualties in the process. At the end of the battle, Spanish forces held the paper mill at Voiskorovo and defensive posts east of Samsanowka, in the eastern bank of the Ishora, preventing the Soviet army from crossing the river.

=== February 11–13 ===
The next day, February 11, 1943, left forward 63rd Guards Rifle Division units were surrounded in several places, but the 63rd Guards Rifle Division was in control of Krasny Bor by evening. A planned counter-attack by the Spanish division and the German 212th Infantry Division was thought likely to be successful but was ultimately not carried out due to concern over the overall position of the 18th Army.

By February 13, 55th Soviet Army had lost almost a third of its initial strength and most of its tanks, and could no longer advance. The total penetration achieved reached a depth of four to five kilometres over a frontage of 14 kilometres. After the Spanish 262nd infantry Regiment and 1st Artillery Battalion evacuated, they bombarded the Soviet positions and attempted a counter-attack to recapture Krasny Bor on February 12. The attack by the 55th Army made a flanking assault by the 67th Army in the Sinyavino sector easier, because of the withdrawal of German forces from that sector.

The main road to Moscow was still controlled by the 18th Army, despite the capture of three km of railway line, The Soviets launched their last major assault in this sector on March 19, 1943, on an area defended by the 262nd infantry Regiment of the Blue Division. It was also repelled with heavy losses on both sides.

Soviet general staff critiques after the battle highlighted the reasons for the failure of the attacks during Operation Polar Star as strongly fortified defenses, faulty reconnaissance, poor command and control on all levels, clumsy employment of tanks and ineffective artillery support.

== Aftermath and consequences ==
The failure by the 55th Soviet Army to follow through on its initial success meant that the encirclement of the German forces in the Mga sector had lost its northern pincer. Lack of success by the other attacking armies, for similar reasons, led to the overall failure of the grandly conceived Operation Polar Star. It would take almost another year before the 18th Army withdrew from the direct approaches to Leningrad. The German 50th Corps, in particular the 250th (Spanish) Infantry Division, had managed to hold the Red Army inside the perimeter of the siege of Leningrad, but at heavy cost.

On February 15, the Blue Division reported casualties of 3,645 killed or wounded and 300 missing or taken prisoner, which amounted to a 70–75% casualty rate of the troops engaged in the battle. Because of these heavy losses and Allied pressure on the Spanish government, the Blue Division was withdrawn to Germany and later disbanded. A new volunteer formation called the Blue Legion remained in combat on the Eastern Front, attached to the 121st Infantry Division until March 1944. It was then also disbanded and the majority of the volunteers sent back to Spain. The 55th Army eventually took part in breaking the siege of Leningrad, securing the Leningrad-Moscow line in 1944. It subsequently advanced into Estonia and fought against German forces in the Courland pocket until 1945.

The Spaniards captured in the battle were not repatriated to Spain until 1954. Krasny Bor remains, for the most part, an obscure battle. The division was awarded a Blue Division Medal, personally designed by Adolf Hitler.

Spanish casualties in all of the Soviet-German conflict totalled 3,934 battle deaths, 570 disease deaths, 326 missing or captured, 8,466 wounded, 7,800 sick, and 1,600 frostbitten.

== Order of battle ==
=== Soviet Union – Leningrad Front ===
Soviet 55th Army, 38,000 soldiers – Lieutenant General Vladimir Petrovich Sviridov

- 43rd Rifle Division
- 45th Guards Rifle Division
- 63rd Guards Rifle Division
- 122nd Tank Brigade
- 31st Tank Regiment
- 34th Ski Brigade
- 35th Ski Brigade
- Artillery and mortar regiments with a total strength of 1,000 guns and mortars

=== Germany – Army Group North, 18th Army ===
German 50th Corps – General Philipp Kleffel

- Elements of 250. Infanterie-Division, (Spanish Blue Division) Major General Emilio Esteban Infantes
  - 250 Field Replacement Battalion
  - 262 Regiment (three battalions)
    - Ski Company
  - 250 Reconnaissance Battalion
  - 1st Artillery Battalion (three Batteries) with 10.5 cm guns
  - One battery of 3rd Artillery Battalion with 10.5 cm guns
  - One battery of 4th Artillery Battalion with 15.0 cm guns
  - 250th Anti Tank Battalion with 37 mm Pak 36 AT-guns
  - Assault sappers group
  - Independent anti-tank gun company with 75 mm Pak40 anti-tank guns.
- 4th SS Police Division - Major General Alfred Wünnenberg
- Battle Group 11th Infantry Division
- Battle Group 21st Infantry Division
- Battle Group 212th Infantry Division
- Battle Group 215th Infantry Division
- Battle Group 227th Infantry Division
- Battle Group 2nd SS Motorized Brigade
- SS-Volunteer Legion Flandern (two companies)

== Notes ==
1. Combat groups were from the Flanders Legion, 2nd SS Motorized Infantry Brigade, 11th, 21st, 212th, 215th, and 227th Infantry Divisions.
2. Glantz, D. p. 297
3. Map on p. 87 in Infantes, E.E.
4. Infantes, E.E. p. 81-2
5. Glantz, D. p. 585

== Bibliography ==
- Clodfelter, M. (2017). Warfare and Armed Conflicts: A Statistical Encyclopedia of Casualty and Other Figures, 1492-2015 (4th ed.). Jefferson, North Carolina: McFarland. ISBN 978-0786474707.
