= 55th Army (Soviet Union) =

- 55-я армия
- Active: 1941–1943
- Country: Soviet Union
- Branch: Red Army
- Type: Combined arms
- Size: Field army
- Part of: Leningrad Front
- Engagements: World War II: Sinyavino Offensive; Lyuban Offensive Operation; Battle of Krasny Bor

The 55th Army (Russian: 55-я армия) was a field army of the Red Army during World War II. It was part of the Leningrad Front and was formed on 1 September 1941. The army fought in the Sinyavino Offensive, Lyuban Offensive Operation and the Battle of Krasny Bor. On 25 December 1943, it was combined with the 67th Army.

== History ==
The 55th Army was formed on 1 September 1941 as part of the Leningrad Front. It was formed from the Task Force of Major General I.G. Lazarev and the 19th Rifle Corps headquarters. The army fought in the Leningrad Strategic Defensive Operation. At the time, it was the largest of the four armies defending Leningrad, with up to half of the active formations.Using the defenses of the Slutsk-Kolpino Fortified Area, the army defended Leningrad's southern approaches in the area of Kolpino, Krasnogvardeysk, Zaborje, Vyritsa, the Izhora River and the Tosna River. Its units stopped the German advance at Putrolovo (ru), Bolshoye Kuzmino, Novaya and Verkhneye Kuzmino. From October 1941 to December 1942, the army carried out local offensives to improve its positions. In November, Vladimir Sviridov replaced Lazarev. On 20 December the army began an attack at Mga, later joined by the 54th Army, to distract from the upcoming Lyuban Offensive Operation but was unsuccessful. On 23 July 1942 a rifle division and a tank brigade of the army attacked the SS Polizei Division south of Kolpino. The attack made some gains.On 26 September elements of two of the army's rifle divisions were sent across the Neva to reinforce the encircled 8th Army. After losing two of three bridgeheads, the 55th Army units withdrew across the Neva.

=== Battle of Krasny Bor ===
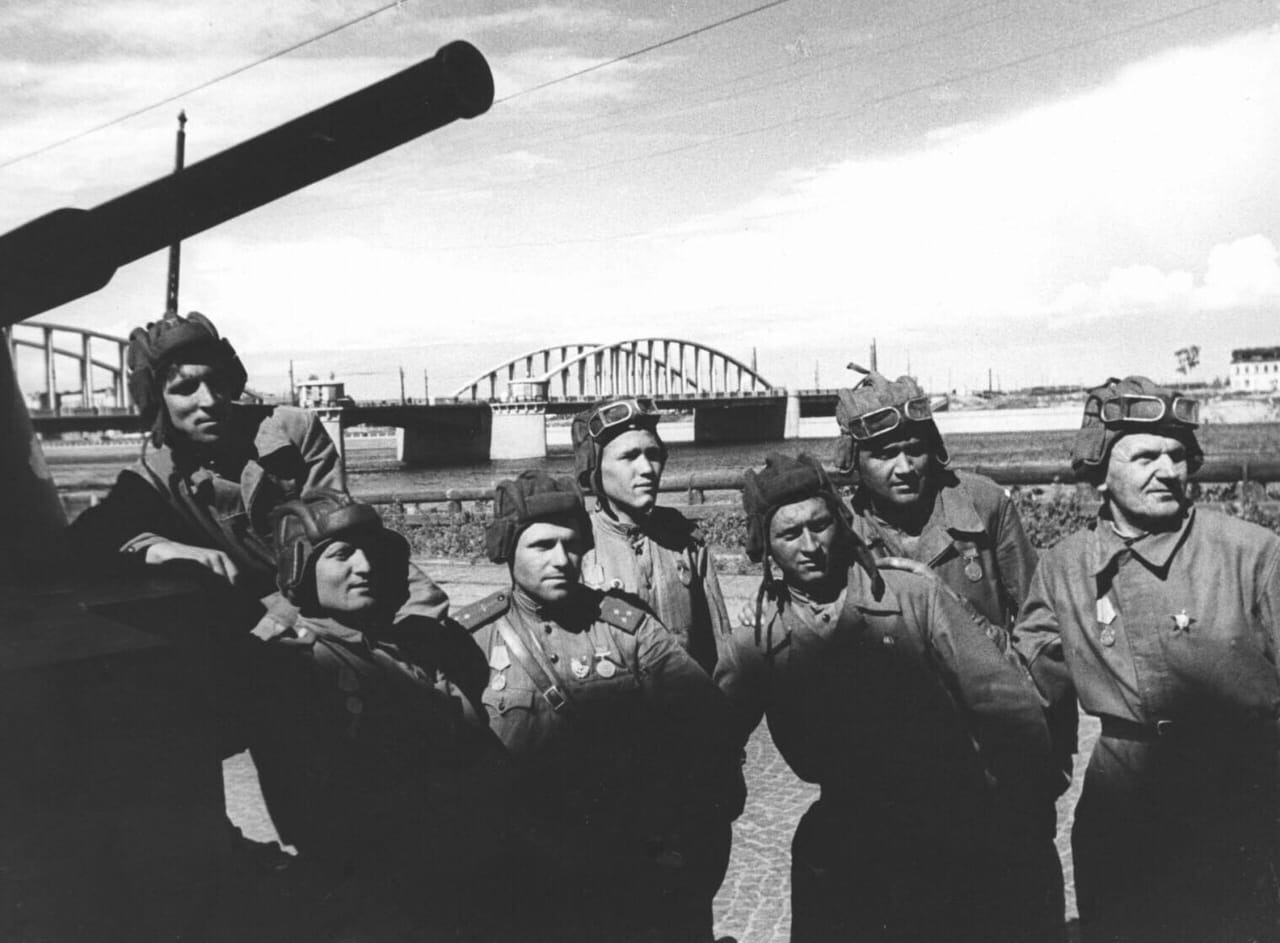
Decorated tankists of the army's 152nd Separate Tank Brigade in front of Volodarsky Bridge, June 1943

In February 1943, the army fought in the Battle of Krasny Bor. The army was the left pincer of the offensive and was to attack out of Kolpino and destroy the Blue Division at Krasny Bor, then advance southeast to Tosno. A division-size attack on 8 February forced several Blue Division outposts back. On 10 February, the 55th Army attacked simultaneously with the 54th Army. The 55th Army attacked along a front of 14 kilometers, concentrating three rifle division and a tank brigade against one regiment of the Blue Division. The Soviet troops broke through the Spanish line and the army's 63rd Guards Rifle Division advanced into and captured Krasny Bor. On the army's left, its 43rd Rifle Division attacked a regiment of the SS Polizei Division, but was unable to advance. German reinforcements arrived and formed a new defensive line south of Krasny Bor, stopping the advance of the 55th Army. The army brought up its tank units and resumed the offensive towards Mishkino (ru) on 17 February but was again repulsed by Tiger tanks of Panzer-Abteilung 502. During the offensive, the army advanced five kilometers and suffered more than 10,000 casualties. The army inflicted 3,645 casualties on the Blue Division. On 19 March, the army attacked again in conjunction with the 8th Army, but was forced to retreat by counterattacks from Legion Flandern and Panzer-Abteilung 502. On 25 December 1943, the army was combined with the 67th Army.

== Composition ==
On 1 September 1941, the army contained the following units:

- 70th Rifle Division
- 90th Rifle Division
- 168th Rifle Division
- 237th Rifle Division
- 1st People's Militia Division
- 4th People's Militia Division
- 2nd Rifle Regiment
- Slutsk-Kolpino Fortified Area

== Commanders ==
- Major General Ivan Gavrilovich Lazarev (01/09/1941 - 17/11/1941),
- Major General of Artillery, from August 1943 Lieutenant General Vladimir Petrovich Sviridov (17/11/1941 - 15/12/1943);
