= List of administrators of Allied-occupied Austria =

Allied occupation zones in Austria, 1945–1955.

This article lists the administrators of Allied-occupied Austria, which represented the Allies of World War II in Allied-occupied Austria (German: Alliierten-besetztes Österreich) from the end of World War II in Europe in 1945 until the re-establishment of Austrian independence in 1955, in accordance with the Austrian State Treaty.

== Officeholders ==
=== American zone ===
High Commissioners

No.	Portrait	High Commissioner	Took office	Left office	Time in office	Defence branch
1	Mark W. Clark	General; Mark W. Clark (1896–1984)	5 July 1945	16 May 1947	1 year, 315 days	United States Army
2	Geoffrey Keyes	Lieutenant general Geoffrey Keyes (1888–1967)	17 May 1947	19 September 1950	3 years, 125 days	United States Army
3	Walter J. Donnelly	Walter J. Donnelly (1896–1970)	20 September 1950	17 July 1952	1 year, 301 days	none
4	Llewellyn Thompson	Llewellyn Thompson (1904–1972)	17 July 1952	27 July 1955	3 years, 10 days	none

=== British zone ===
High Commissioners

No.	Portrait	High Commissioner	Took office	Left office	Time in office	Defence branch
1	Sir Richard McCreery	General; Sir Richard McCreery (1898–1967)	July 1945	March 1946	8 months	British Army
2	Sir James Steele	General; Sir James Steele (1894–1975)	March 1946	October 1947	1 year, 7 months	British Army
3	Sir Alexander Galloway	Lieutenant general Sir Alexander Galloway (1895–1977)	October 1947	1 January 1950	2 years, 3 months	British Army
4	Sir John Winterton	Major general Sir John Winterton (1898–1987)	1 January 1950	1 August 1950	212 days	British Army
5	Sir Harold Caccia	Sir Harold Caccia (1905–1990)	1 August 1950	5 February 1954	3 years, 188 days	none
6	Sir Geoffrey Wallinger	Sir Geoffrey Wallinger (1903–1979)	5 February 1954	27 July 1955	1 year, 172 days	none

=== French zone ===
High Commissioners

No.	Portrait	High Commissioner	Took office	Left office	Time in office	Defence branch
1	Antoine Béthouart	Army general Antoine Béthouart (1889–1982)	8 July 1945	September 1950	5 years, 1 month	French Army
2	Jean Payart [de]	Jean Payart (1892–1969)	September 1950	October 1954	4 years, 1 month	none
3	Jean Chauvel [fr]	Jean Chauvel (1897–1979)	October 1954	February 1955	4 months	none
4	Roger Lalouette [de]	Roger Lalouette (1904–1980)	February 1955	June 1955	4 months	none
5	François Seydoux de Clausonne	François Seydoux de Clausonne (1905–1981)	3 June 1955	27 July 1955	54 days	none

=== Soviet zone ===
Military commander

No.	Portrait	Commander	Took office	Left office	Time in office	Defence branch
N/A	Fyodor Tolbukhin	Marshal of the Soviet Union; Fyodor Tolbukhin (1894–1949); Commander of the 3rd Ukrainian Front (in Vienna)	13 April 1945	July 1945	2 months	Soviet Army

High Commissioners

No.	Portrait	High Commissioner	Took office	Left office	Time in office	Defence branch
1	Ivan Konev	Marshal of the Soviet Union; Ivan Konev (1897–1973)	July 1945	25 April 1946	9 months	Soviet Army
2	Vladimir Kurasov	Army general Vladimir Kurasov (1897–1973)	10 May 1946	2 April 1949	2 years, 327 days	Soviet Army
3	Vladimir Sviridov	Lieutenant general Vladimir Sviridov (1897–1963)	4 May 1949	7 June 1953	4 years, 34 days	Soviet Army
4	Ivan Ilyichev	Lieutenant general (Ret'd); Ivan Ilyichev (1905–1983)	7 June 1953	27 July 1955	2 years, 50 days	Soviet Army (Ret'd)

== See also ==
- History of Austria § Allied occupation
- History of Vienna § Allied occupation
  - List of commandants of Vienna Sectors
