= Grigorovo, Novgorod Oblast =

Village in Novgorod Oblast, Russia

Grigorovo Григорово
- Village
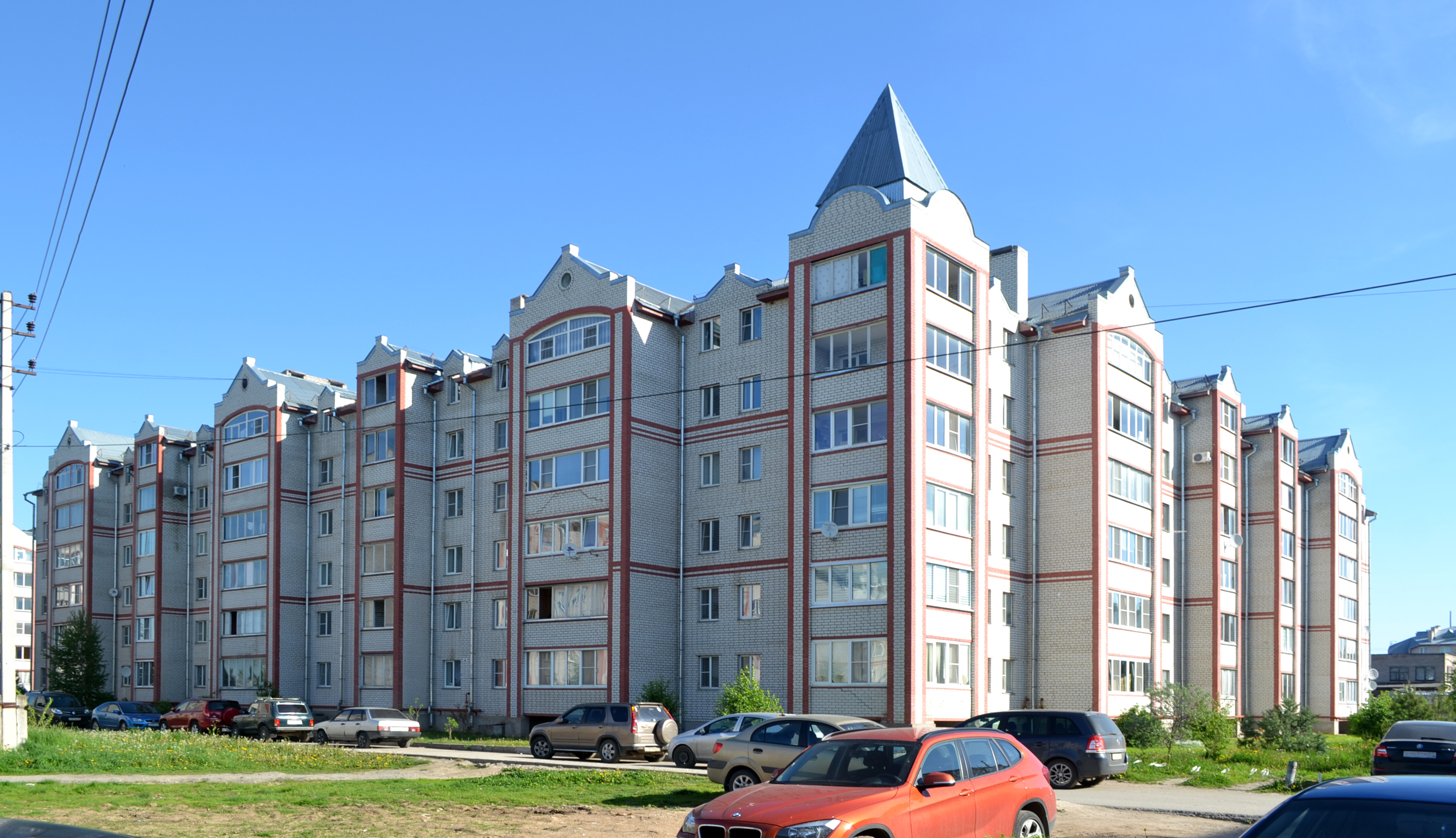
- A street in Grigorovo
- Interactive map of Grigorovo
- Location of Grigorovo Grigorovo (Novgorod Oblast)
- Coordinates: 58°33.5′N 31°12.44′E
- Country: Russia
- Federal subject: Novgorod Oblast
- Administrative district: Novgorodsky District
- Founded: 17th century

Population (2010 Census)
  - Total: 3,330
  - Estimate (2021): 4,881 (+46.6%)

Municipal status
  - Municipal district: Novgorodsky Municipal District
  - Rural settlement: Ermolinskoye Rural Settlement
- Time zone: UTC+3 (MSK)
- Postal code: 173018
- Dialing code: +7 8162
- OKTMO ID: 49625418122

Grigorovo (Russian: Гри́горово, IPA: [grʲiˈgərəvə]) is a village in Novgorodsky District of Novgorod Oblast, Russia, located on the right bank of the Veryazha River, west of and immediately adjacent to Veliky Novgorod. Municipally, it is incorporated as Ermolinskoye Rural Settlement in Novgorodsky Municipal District, one of the eight rural settlements in the district. Population: 4,881 (2021 census).

== History ==
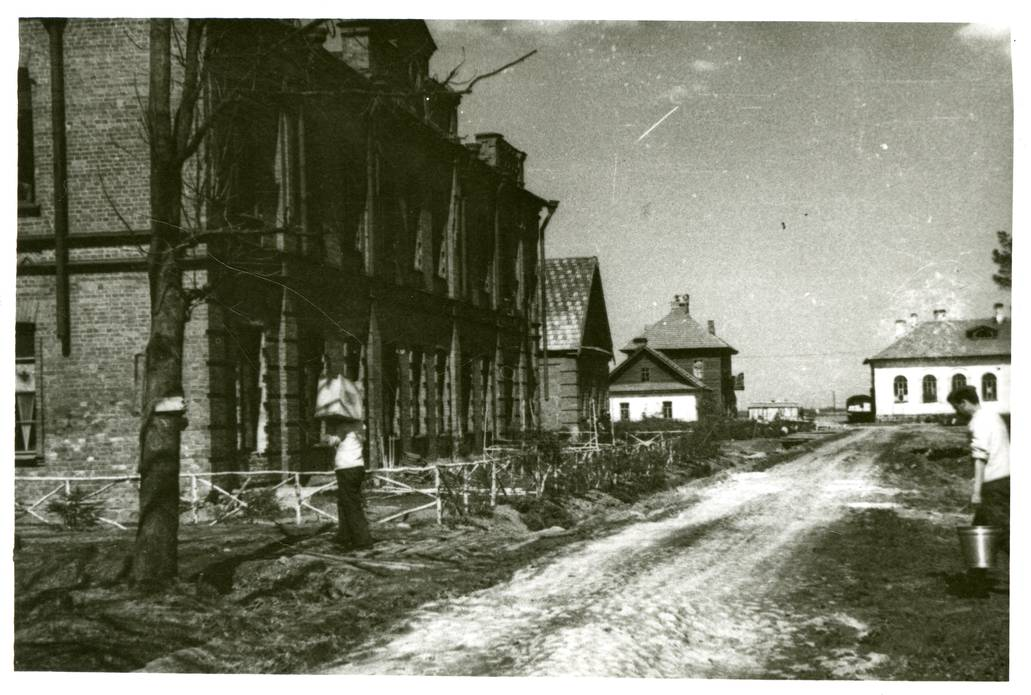
Grigorovo 1941—1942

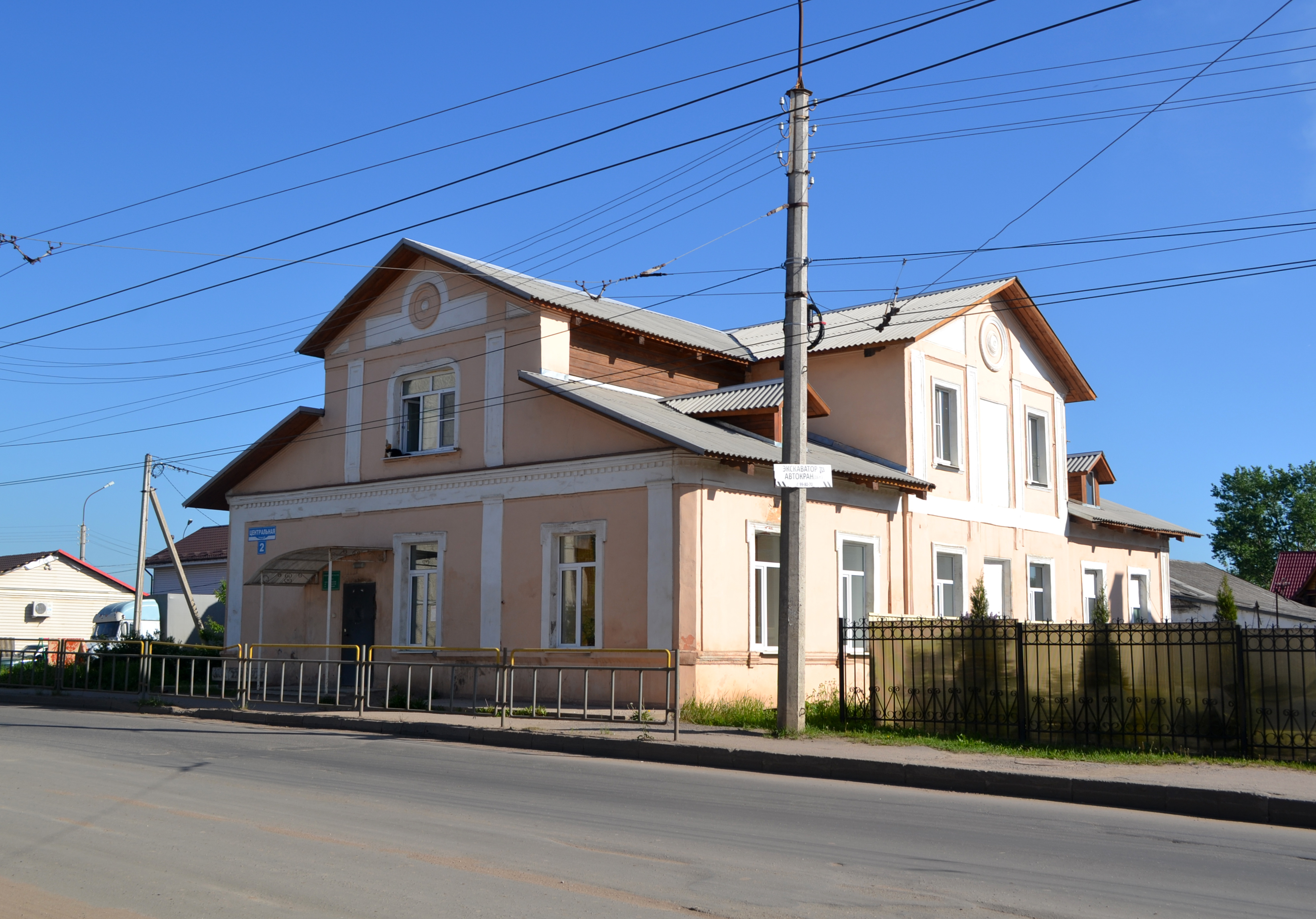
Manor house of the landowner Grigorova

Grigorovo

Before Grigorovo received its current name, the village was called Yakovleva (Yakovlevo). The village of Yakovleva was first mentioned in 17th century. The village name is inextricably linked to the estate of the landowner Grigorova, the construction of which took place here in 1841. And since then the village has been named Grigorovo. In 1884, Grigorovo was mentioned as a part of Nikolskaya Volost of Novgorodsky Uyezd of Novgorod Governorate.

In August 1941, during World War II, the village was occupied by the German Army. In Grigorovo was located the headquarters of the Blue Division. The Red Army liberated the village on January 19, 1944.

On July 5, 1944, Novgorodsky District was transferred to newly established Novgorod Oblast. On January 17, 2005, Grigorovo became the administrative center of newly established Grigorovskaya Rural Settlement in Novgorodsky District of Novgorod Oblast. On April 1, 2014 the settlement was abolished.

== Economy ==
=== Industry ===
On the territory of village there are no industrial enterprises.

=== Transportation ===
Novgorod-Lugsky Station is located 1 km from Grigorovo, from where trains depart to Luga.
