= Ivan Konev =

Soviet military commander (1897–1973)

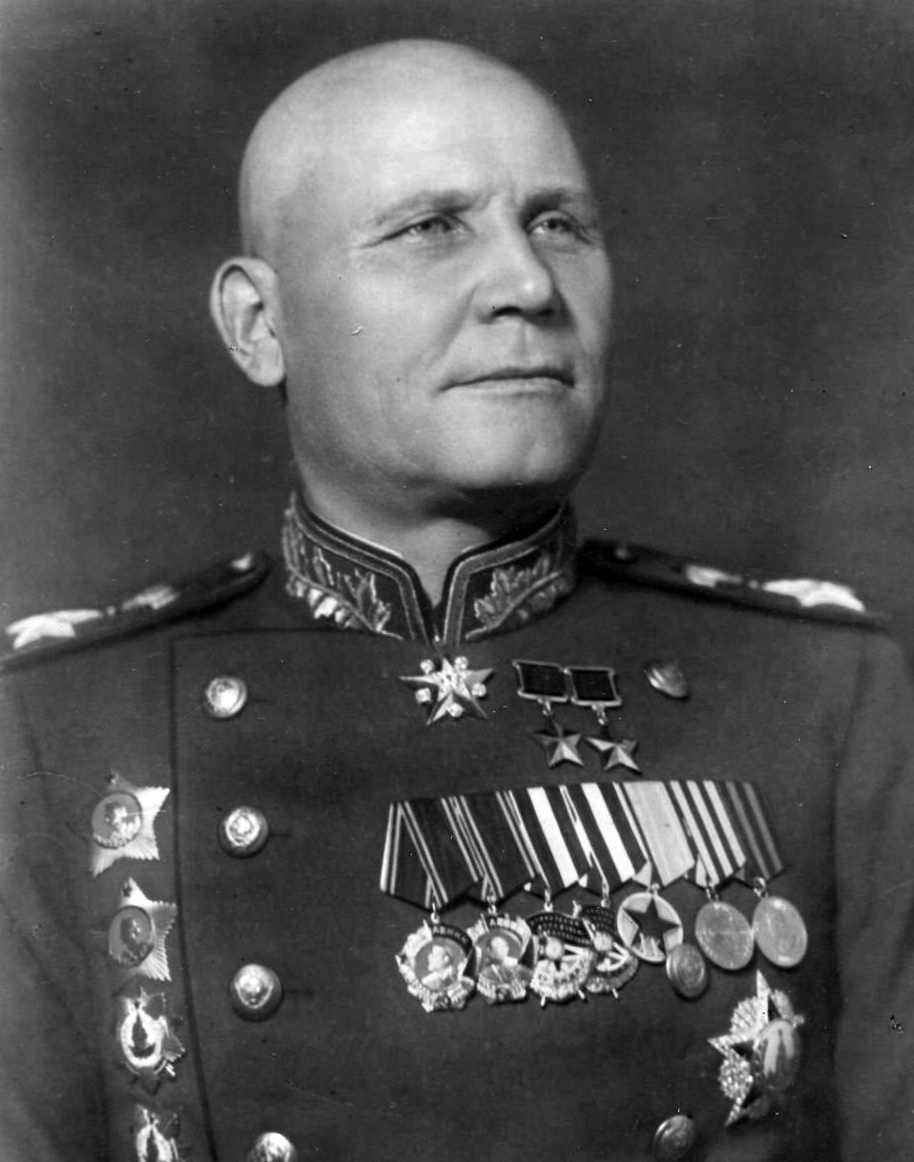
- Konev in 1945

1st Supreme Commander of the Unified Armed Forces of the Warsaw Treaty Organization
- In office 14 May 1955 – April 1960
- Preceded by: Position created
- Succeeded by: Andrei Grechko

1st High Commissioner of the Soviet occupation of Austria
- In office July 1945 – 25 April 1946
- President: Karl Renner
- Chancellor: Karl Renner
- Preceded by: Fyodor Tolbukhin (as military commander)
- Succeeded by: Vladimir Kurasov

Personal details
- Born: 28 December 1897 Lodeyno, Russian Empire
- Died: 21 May 1973 (aged 75) Moscow, Soviet Union
- Resting place: Kremlin Wall Necropolis
- Awards: Hero of the Soviet Union (twice) Order of Victory

Military service
- Allegiance: Russian Empire; Soviet Russia; Soviet Union
- Branch/service: Imperial Russian Army; Red Army; Soviet Army
- Years of service: 1916–1962
- Rank: Marshal of the Soviet Union
- Commands: 2nd Rifle Division; 2nd Red Banner Army; Transbaikal Military District; Steppe Front; Kalinin Front; Western Front; 2nd Ukrainian Front; 1st Ukrainian Front; Commander of Warsaw Pact Armed Forces
- Battles/wars: World War I; Kerensky Offensive; Russian Civil War; World War II; Great Patriotic War; Operation Barbarossa; Battle of Moscow; Rzhev–Sychyovka offensive; Battle of Kursk; Belgorod–Kharkov offensive operation; Dnieper–Carpathian offensive; Battle of Korsun–Cherkassy; First Jassy–Kishinev offensive; Vistula–Oder offensive; Battle of Berlin; Occupation of Austria; Hungarian Uprising

Ivan Stepanovich Konev (Russian: Иван Степанович Конев, IPA: [ɪˈvan sʲtʲɪˈpanəvʲɪtɕ ˈkonʲɪf]; 28 December 1897 – 21 May 1973) was a Soviet general and Marshal of the Soviet Union who led Red Army forces on the Eastern Front during World War II, responsible for taking much of Axis-occupied Eastern Europe.

Born to a peasant family, Konev was conscripted into the Imperial Russian Army in 1916 and fought in World War I. In 1919, he joined the Bolsheviks and served in the Red Army during the Russian Civil War. After graduating from Frunze Military Academy in 1926, Konev gradually rose through the ranks of the Soviet military. By 1939, he had become a candidate to the Central Committee of the Communist Party.

Following the German invasion of the Soviet Union in 1941, Konev took part in a series of major campaigns, including the battles of Moscow and Rzhev. Konev further commanded forces in major Soviet offensives at Kursk, in the Dnieper–Carpathian and Vistula–Oder offensives. In February 1944, he was made a Marshal of the Soviet Union. On the eve of German defeat, Konev's 1st Ukrainian Front was pitted against the armies of Georgy Zhukov in the Race to Berlin. Konev was the first Allied commander to enter Prague, the capital of Czechoslovakia, after the Prague uprising.

He replaced Zhukov as commander of Soviet ground forces in 1946. In 1956, he was appointed commander of the Warsaw Pact armed forces, and led the violent suppression of the Hungarian Revolution and Prague Spring. In 1961, as commander of Soviet forces in East Germany, he ordered the closing of West Berlin to East Berlin during the building of the Berlin Wall. Konev remained a popular military figure in the Soviet Union until his death in 1973.

== Early life ==
Konev was born 28 December 1897 in the village of Lodeyno in the Nikolsky Uyezd of Vologda Governorate to a peasant family of Russian ethnicity. Konev graduated from a parish school in the village of Yakovlevskaya Gora in 1906, and later the Nikolo-Pushemsky Zemstvo School in the neighboring village of Schetkino in 1912. At the age of 15, he found work as a forester and lumberjack at Podosinovets and Arkhangelsk.

== Military career ==
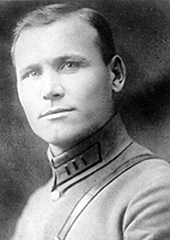
Konev as a regimental commander

In the beginning of 1915, he was conscripted into the Imperial Russian Army. Konev was sent to the 2nd Heavy Artillery Brigade at Moscow and then graduated from artillery training courses. Posted to the 2nd Separate Heavy Artillery Battalion (then part of the Southwestern Front) as a junior sergeant in 1917, he fought in the Kerensky Offensive in Galicia in July 1917.

When the October Revolution broke out in November 1917, he was demobilized and returned home; in 1918, he joined the Russian Communist Party (Bolsheviks) and the Red Army, serving as an artilleryman. During the Russian Civil War of 1917-1923, he served with the Red Army in the Russian Far Eastern Republic. His commander at one time was Kliment Voroshilov, a close colleague of Joseph Stalin, who later became People's Commissar for Defense (in office: 1925-1940). (This connection was the key to Konev's subsequent career and to his protection during the Great Purge of the late 1930s.) In his memoirs, he wrote: "Together with a group of demobilized soldiers, I organized the overthrow of the land administration, the confiscation of agricultural land and the imprisonment of traders." He participated in the violent suppression of the 1921 Kronstadt rebellion.

In 1926 Konev completed advanced officer training courses at the Frunze Military Academy, and between then and 1941 he held a series of progressively more senior commands, becoming head first of the Transbaikal then of the North Caucasus Military Districts in 1940 and 1941, respectively. In 1934 he became commander and political commissar of the 37th Rifle Division. In July 1938, he was appointed commander of the 2nd Red Banner Army. In 1937 he became a Deputy of the Supreme Soviet and in 1939 a candidate member of the Party Central Committee.

=== World War II ===
When Nazi Germany invaded the Soviet Union in June 1941, Konev was assigned command of the 19th Army in the Vitebsk region, and waged a series of defensive battles during the Red Army's retreat, first to Smolensk and then to the approaches to Moscow.

He commanded the Kalinin Front from October 1941 to August 1942, playing a key role in the fighting around Moscow and the Soviet counter-offensive during the winter of 1941–42. For his role in the successful defense of the Soviet capital, Stalin promoted Konev to Colonel-General. In the summer of 1942 Konev led the Kalinin Front and later the Western Front in the battle on the Rzhev salient.

Konev held "Front" (army group) commands for the rest of the war. He commanded the Soviet Western Front until February 1943, the North-Western Front February–July 1943, and the 2nd Ukrainian Front from July 1943 (later further the 1st Ukrainian Front) until May 1945.

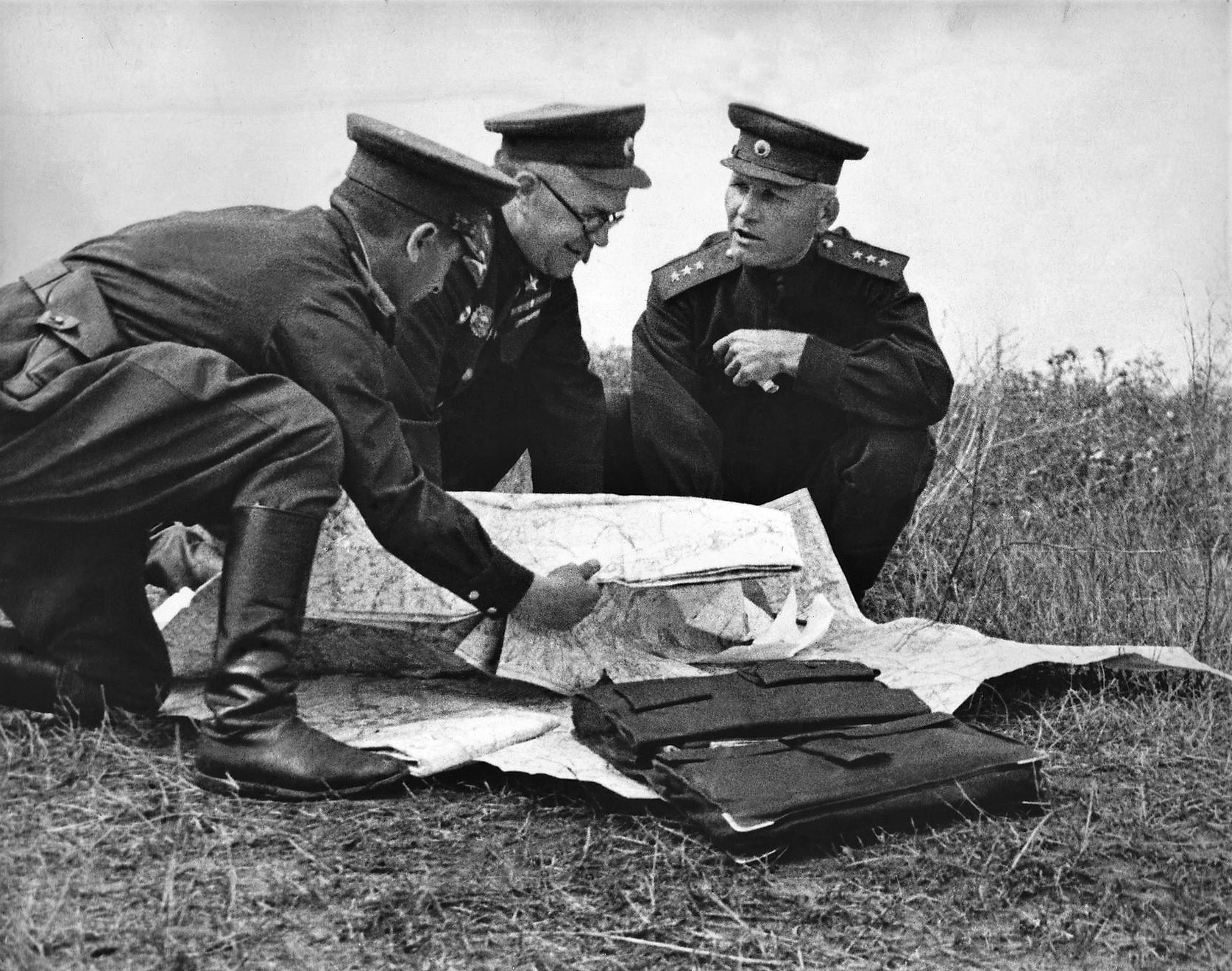
Konev as commander of the Steppe Front with Georgy Zhukov during the Battle of Kursk, 1943

He participated in the Battle of Kursk, commanding the southern part of the Soviet counter-offensive, the Steppe Front, where he actively and energetically promoted maskirovka (the use of military camouflage and deception). Among the maskirovka measures he adopted to achieve tactical surprise were the camouflaging of defense lines and depots; dummy units and supply points; a dummy air-defense network; and the use of reconnaissance units to verify the quality of his army's camouflage and deception works. In David Glantz's view, Konev's forces "generated a major portion of the element of surprise".

As a result, the Germans seriously underestimated the strength of the Soviet defenses. The commander of the 19th Panzer division of the Wehrmacht, General G. Schmidt, wrote that "We did not assume that there was even one fourth [of the Russian strength] of what we had to encounter".

After the Soviet victory (August 1943) at Kursk, Konev's armies retook Belgorod, Odessa, Kharkov and Kiev. The subsequent Korsun–Shevchenkovsky Offensive led to the Battle of the Korsun–Cherkassy Pocket which took place from 24 January to 16 February 1944. The offensive was part of the Dnieper–Carpathian Offensive. In it, the 1st and 2nd Ukrainian Fronts, commanded, respectively, by Nikolai Vatutin and by Konev, trapped German forces of Army Group South in a pocket or "cauldron" west of the Dnieper river. During weeks of fighting, the two Red Army Fronts tried to eradicate the pocket; the subsequent Korsun battle eliminated the cauldron. According to Milovan Djilas, Konev openly boasted of his killing of thousands of German prisoners of war: "The cavalry finally finished them off. 'We let the Cossacks cut up as long as they wished. They even hacked off the hands of those who raised them to surrender' the Marshal recounted with a smile."

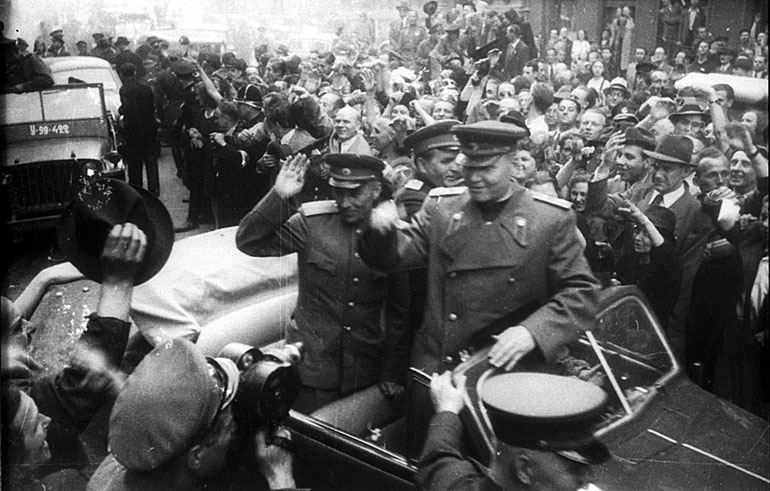
Residents of Prague greet Marshal Konev upon the arrival of the Red Army on 9 May 1945

For Konev's achievements in Ukraine, the Presidium promoted him to Marshal of the Soviet Union in February 1944. Konev was one of Stalin's favorite generals and one of the few senior commanders whom even Stalin admired for his ruthlessness.

During 1944 Konev's armies advanced from Ukraine and Belarus into Poland and later into Czechoslovakia. In May 1944 he participated in an unsuccessful invasion of the Balkans, (the first Jassy–Kishinev Offensive) together with Generals Rodion Malinovsky and Fyodor Tolbukhin.

By July, he had advanced to the Vistula River in central Poland, and was awarded the title of Hero of the Soviet Union. In September 1944 his forces, now designated the Fourth Ukrainian Front, advanced into Slovakia and fought alongside the Slovak partisans in their rebellion against German occupation.

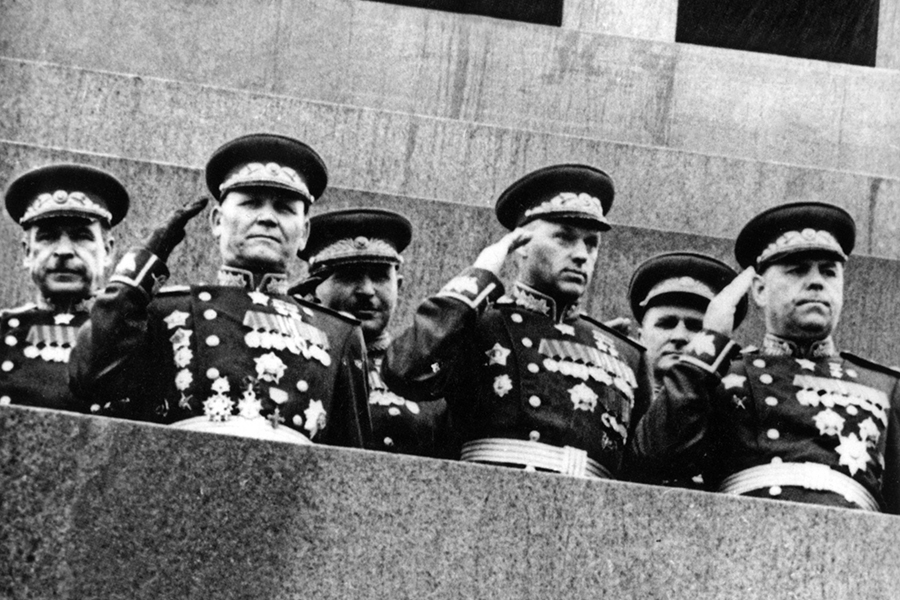
Ivan Konev (front row, 1st from left) at the Victory Parade, 24 June 1945

In January 1945, Konev, together with Georgy Zhukov, commanded the Soviet armies which launched the massive winter offensive in western Poland, driving the German forces from the Vistula to the Oder River. In southern Poland his armies seized Kraków (18 January 1945). Soviet historians, and generally Russian sources, claimed that Konev preserved Kraków from Nazi-planned destruction by ordering a lightning attack on the city. Konev's January 1945 offensive also prevented planned destruction of the Silesian industry by the retreating Germans.

In April Konev's troops, together with the 1st Belorussian Front under his competitor, Marshal Zhukov, forced the line of the Oder and advanced towards Berlin. Konev's forces entered the city first, but Stalin gave Zhukov the honor of capturing Berlin and hoisting the Soviet flag over the Reichstag. Konev was ordered to the southwest, where his forces linked up with elements of the United States Army at Torgau (25 April 1945) and also retook Prague (9 May 1945) shortly after the official surrender of the German forces.

=== Post-war career ===
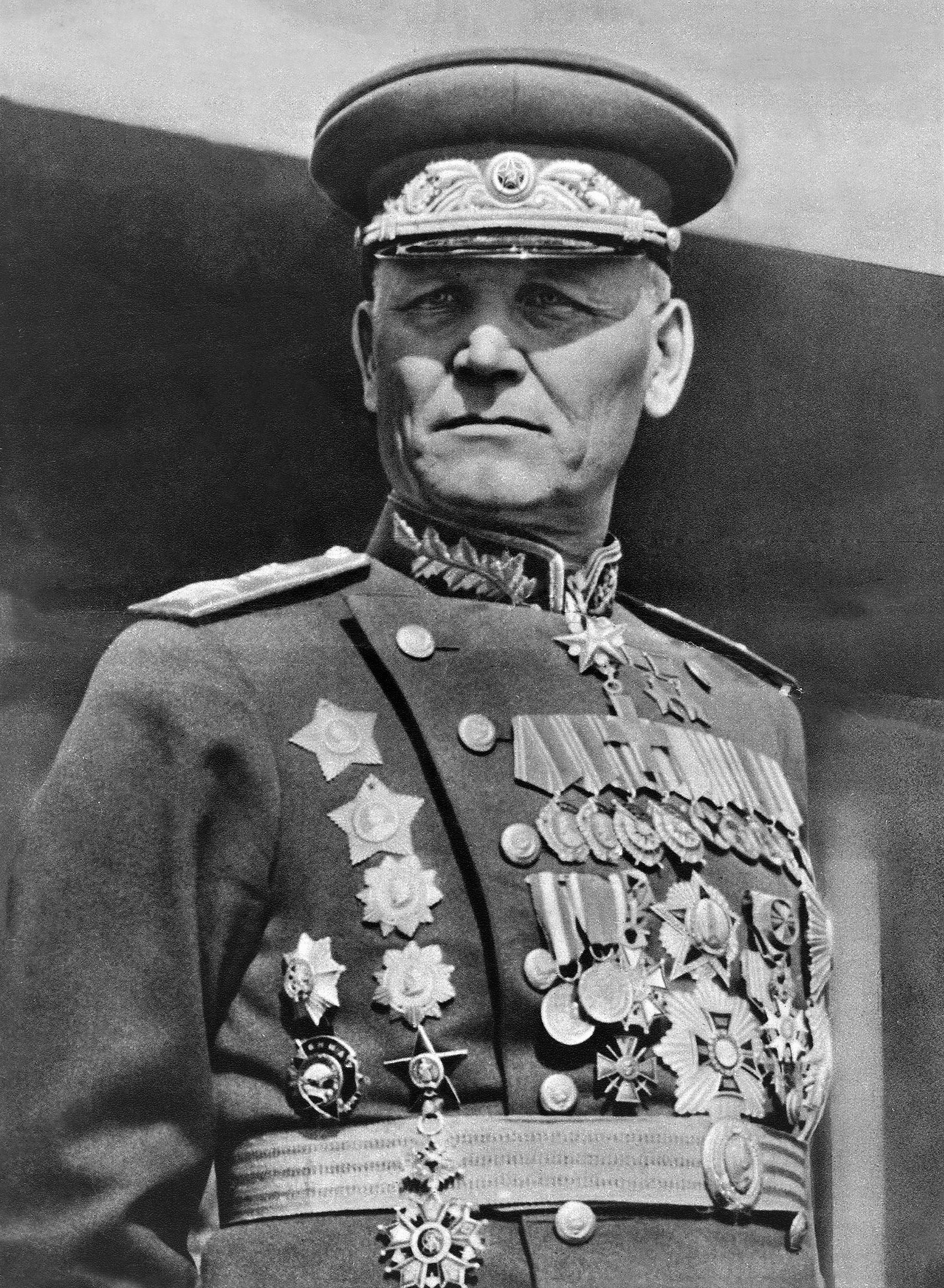
Konev in Moscow, June 1945

After the war the Soviet Union appointed Konev as head of the Soviet occupation forces in Eastern Germany and also Allied High Commissioner for Austria. In 1946 he became Commander-in-Chief of the Soviet Ground Forces and First Deputy Minister of Defense of the Soviet Union, replacing Zhukov. He held these posts until 1950, when he was appointed commander of the Carpathian Military District. He held this post until 1960, when he retired from active service. In 1961–62, however, he was recalled and was again commander of the Soviet forces in East Germany, where he ordered the closing of West Berlin to East Berlin during the construction of the Berlin Wall. He was then appointed to the largely ceremonial post of Inspector-General of the Defense Ministry.

Following the Prague Spring, Konev headed a delegation that visited Czechoslovakia in May 1968 to celebrate the anniversary of the Soviet victory during World War II. After Stalin's death, Konev returned to prominence. He became a key ally of the new party leader Nikita Khrushchev, being entrusted with the trial of the Stalinist police chief Lavrenty Beria in 1953. He was again appointed First Deputy Minister of Defense and commander of Soviet ground forces, posts he held until 1956, when he was named Commander-in-Chief of the Armed Forces of the Warsaw Pact. Shortly after his appointment he led the suppression of the Hungarian Revolution. It has been claimed that Konev visited military units in Czechoslovakia in order to obtain first-hand information to better assess the situation in the country, but there is no documentary evidence to support this.

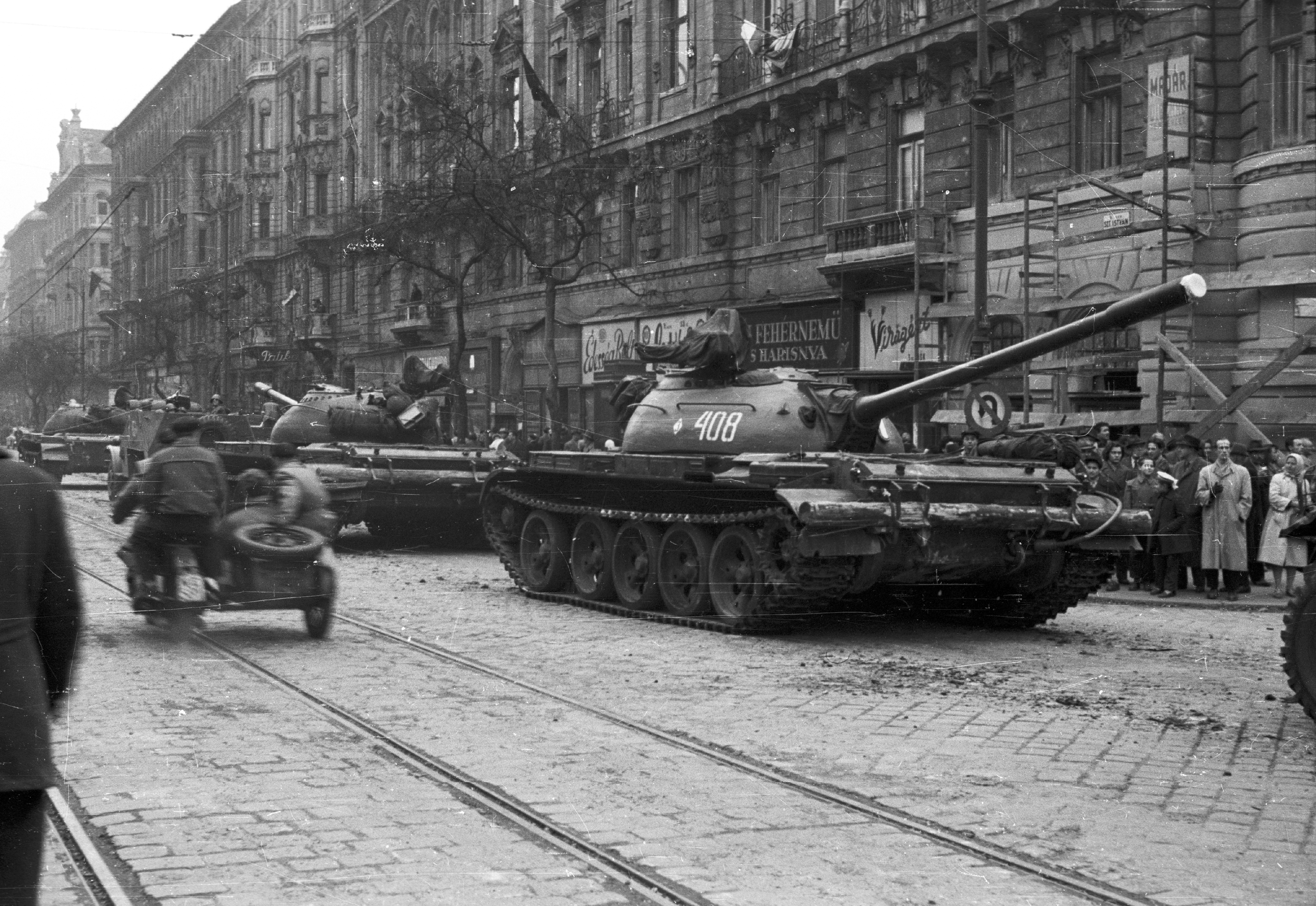
Soviet T-54s in Budapest during the suppression of the Hungarian Revolution

The British military historian John Erickson wrote that he was surprised with the extent of personal archives (lichnye arkhivy) held by former Red Army soldiers of many ranks, and that "there is no substitute for having the late Marshal Konev (sic) – spectacles perched on nose – read from his own personal notebook, detailing operational orders, his own personal instructions to select commanders and his tally of Soviet casualties. And while on the subject of casualties, Marshal Konev made it plain that, though such figures did exist, he was not prepared on his own authority to allow certain figures to be released for publication while a number of commanders were still alive."

Konev remained one of the Soviet Union's most admired military figures until his death in 1973. He married twice, and his daughter Nataliya is Dean of the Department of Linguistics and Literature at the Military University of the Ministry of Defense of the Russian Federation.

In 1969, the Ministry of Defence of the USSR published Konev's 285-page war memoir called Forty-Five. It was later translated into English in the same year and published by Progress Publishers, Moscow. This work discusses Konev's taking of Berlin, Prague, his work with Zhukov, Stalin, his field meeting with General Omar Bradley and Jascha Heifetz. In English, the book was titled I. Konev – Year of Victory. It was also published in Spanish and French under the titles El Año 45 and L'an 45 respectively.

Konev died on 21 May 1973 at age 75 in Moscow. Following his cremation, his ashes were placed in the Kremlin Wall Necropolis with those of the greatest figures of the USSR, and can still be visited today.

== Monuments ==
Konev has monuments, primarily in Russia. The places include Svidník, Patriot Park (Moscow region), Kirov, Belgorod, Nizhny Novgorod, Omsk, and Vologda.

On 9 January 1991, his memorial sculpture in Kraków was dismantled less than just 4 years after it had been unveiled. The sculpture was given to the Russian city of Kirov. The memorial plaque in front of the apartment building where he lived (three blocks from the Kremlin) is still mounted on the brick wall.

The Konev monument erected by the communist government of Czechoslovakia in Prague 6 (náměstí Interbrigády) in 1980 became a subject of controversy that escalated in 2018, after which the city administration added explanatory text to the monument, noting the participation of its subject in the suppression of the Hungarian Revolution and the Prague Spring. The monument was removed on 3 April 2020, with the Czech president Miloš Zeman criticizing the removal as "an abuse of the state of emergency". Within days, the Investigative Committee of the Russian Federation announced it would begin a symbolic investigation of the alleged "defiling of symbols of Russia's military glory".

A monument to Konev was unveiled in the village of Kruzlovz in Slovakia on 3 October 2026.

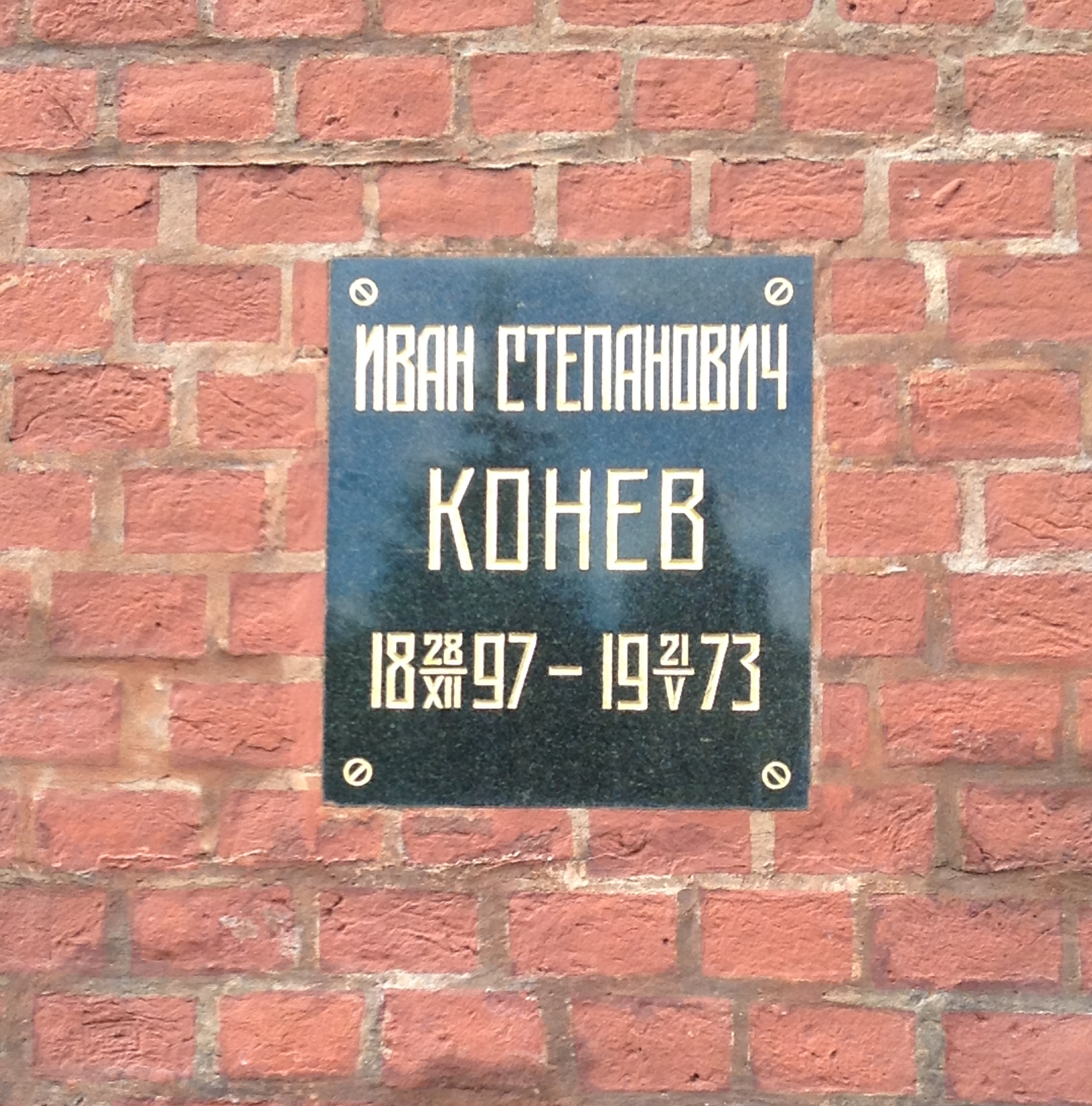
Konev's grave in the Kremlin Wall

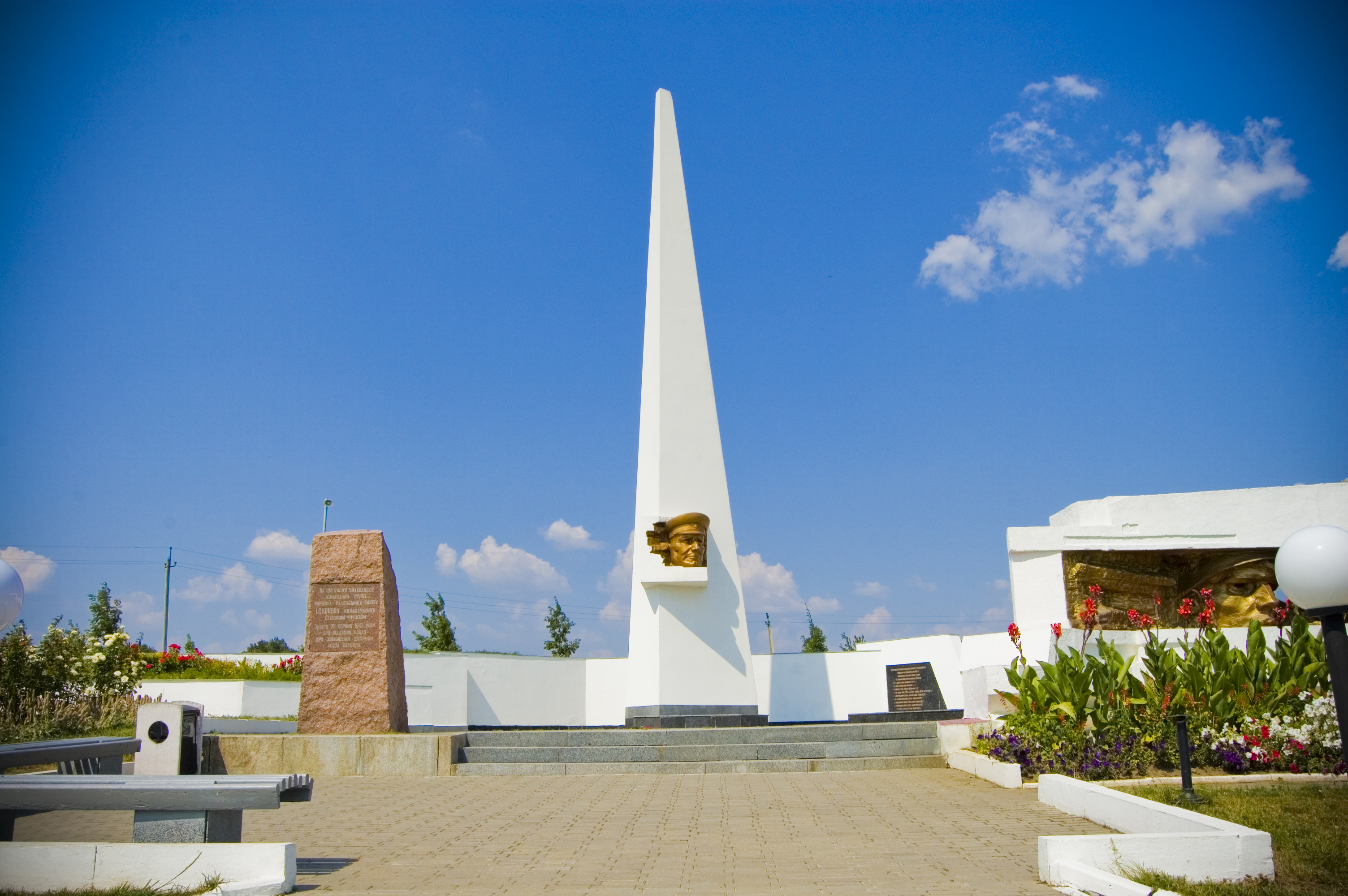
Former monument in Kharkiv

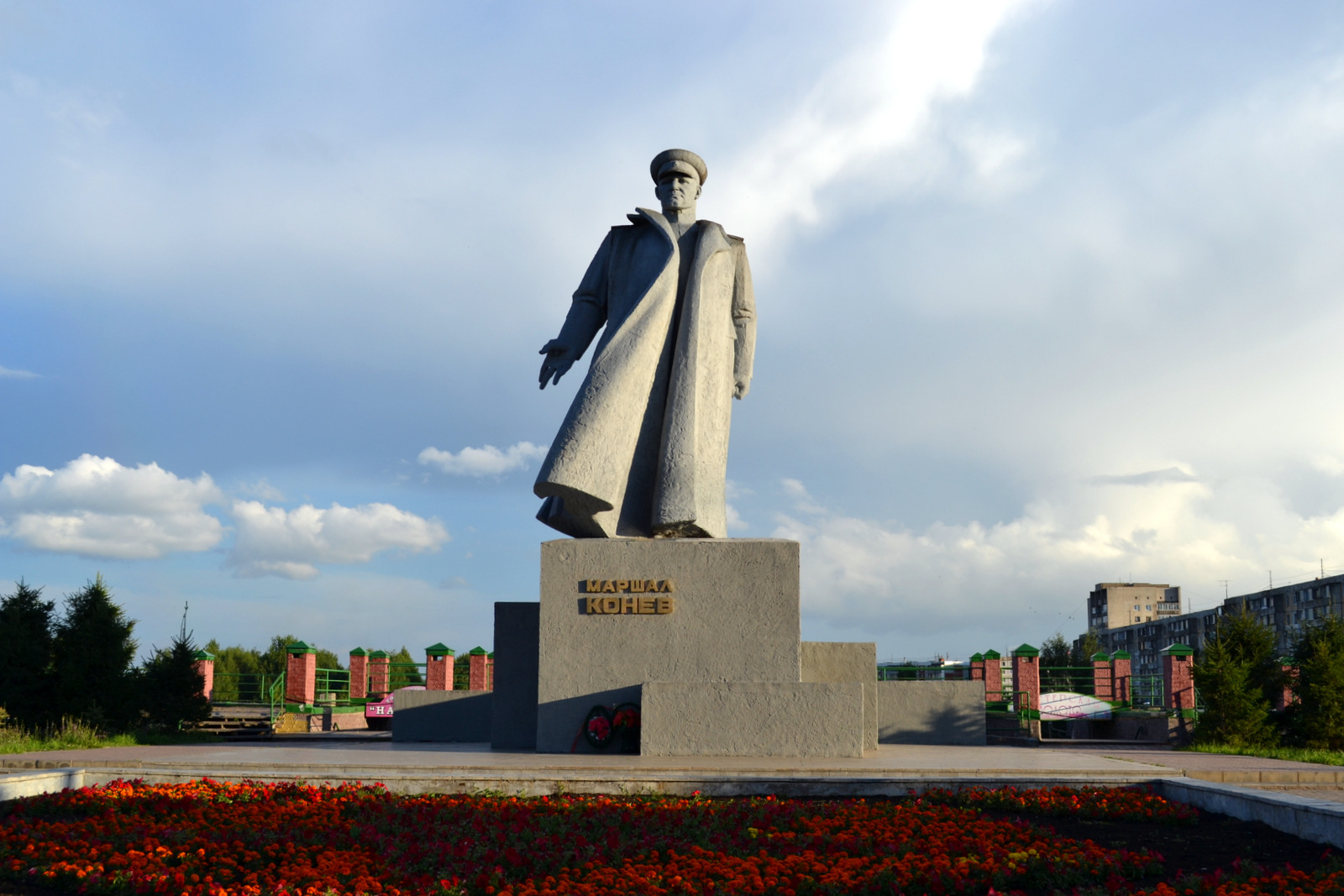
Monument in Kirov

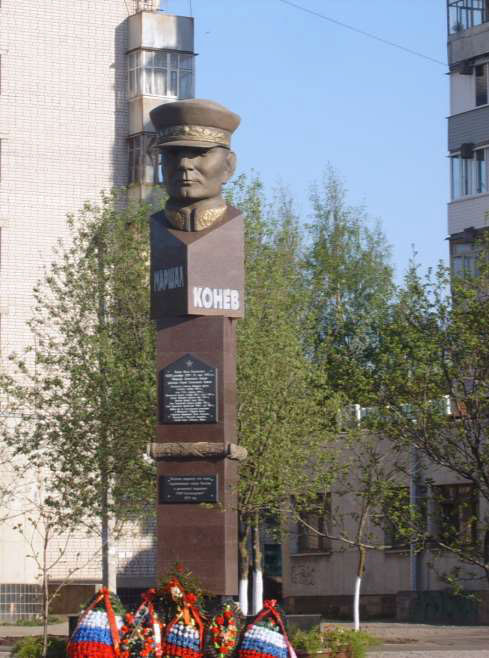
Monument in Vologda

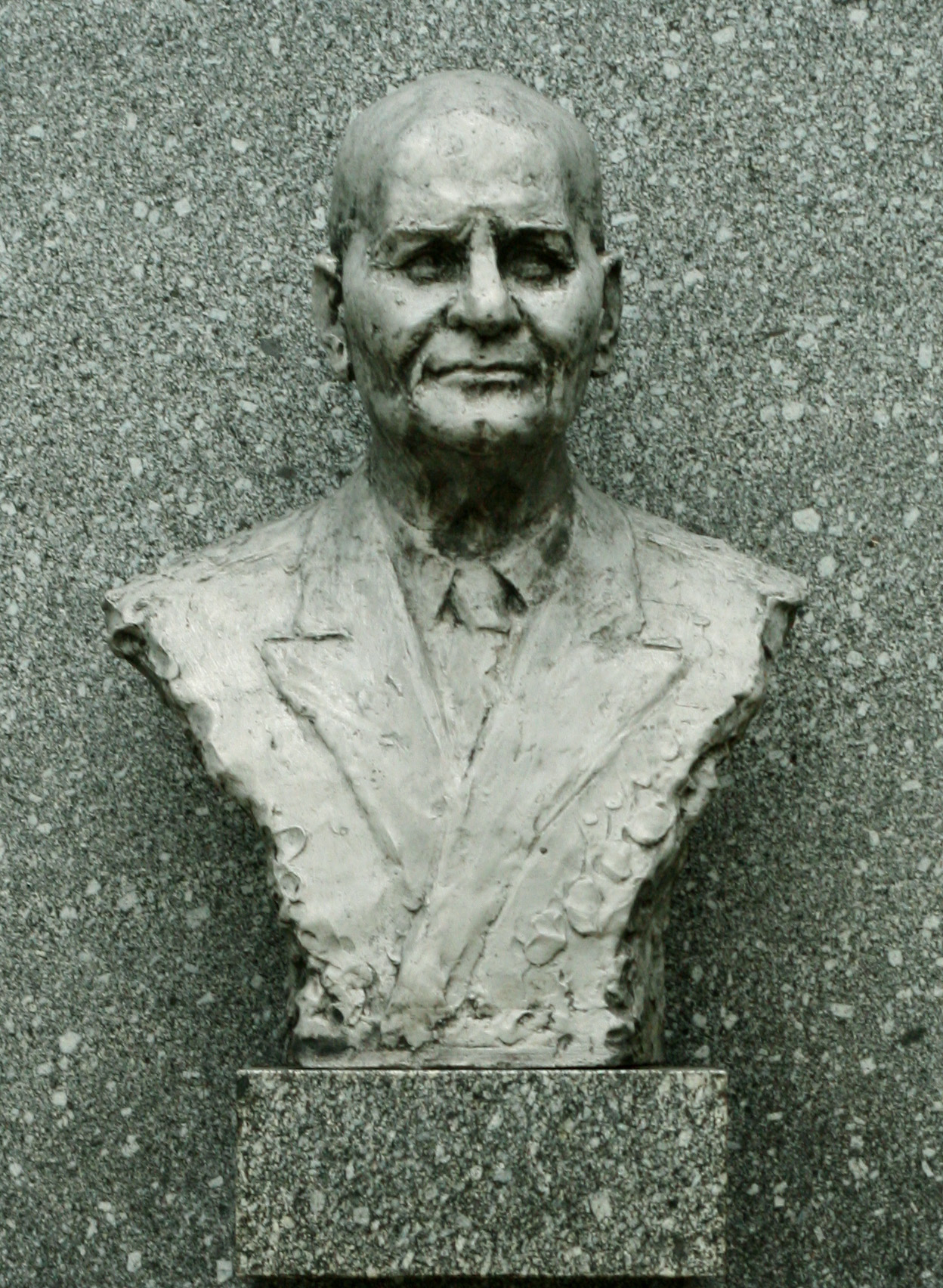
Bust in Slovakia

== Honours and awards ==
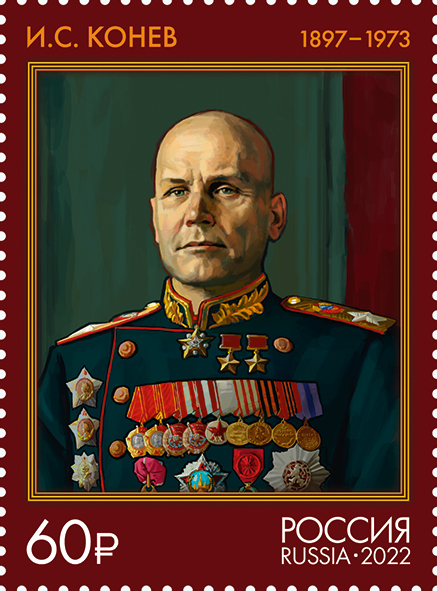
Konev on a 2022 stamp of Russia

Soviet Union

"Gold Star" Hero of the Soviet Union, twice (29 July 1944, 1 June 1945)
Order of Victory (No. 5–3 March 1945)
Seven Orders of Lenin (29 July 1944, 21 February 1945, 27 December 1947, 18 December 1956, 27 December 1957, 27 December 1967, 28 December 1972)
Order of the October Revolution (22 February 1968)
Order of the Red Banner, three times (22 February 1938, 3 November 1944, 20 June 1949)
Order of Suvorov, 1st class, twice (27 August 1943, 17 May 1944)
Order of Kutuzov, 1st class, twice (9 April 1943, 28 July 1943)
Order of the Red Star, (16 August 1936)
Medal "For the Defence of Moscow" (1 May 1944)
Medal "For the Liberation of Prague" (9 June 1945)
Medal "For the Capture of Berlin" (9 June 1945)
Medal "For the Victory over Germany in the Great Patriotic War 1941–1945" (1945)
Jubilee Medal "Twenty Years of Victory in the Great Patriotic War 1941-1945" (1965)
Jubilee Medal "XX Years of the Workers' and Peasants' Red Army" (22 February 1938)
Jubilee Medal "30 Years of the Soviet Army and Navy" (22 February 1948)
Jubilee Medal "40 Years of the Armed Forces of the USSR" (17 February 1958)
Jubilee Medal "50 Years of the Armed Forces of the USSR" (1968)
Jubilee Medal "In Commemoration of the 100th Anniversary of the Birth of Vladimir Ilyich Lenin" (1969)
Honorary weapon – sword inscribed with golden national emblem of the Soviet Union (22 February 1968)

- Honorary citizen of Bălți (Moldova) and other cities

Foreign

Hero of the Czechoslovak Socialist Republic (28 April 1970)
Hero of the Mongolian People's Republic (Mongolian People's Republic, 7 May 1971)
Patriotic Order of Merit, in silver (East Germany)
Order of Sukhbaatar, twice (Mongolian People's Republic, 1961 and 1971)
Order of the Red Banner (Mongolian People's Republic)
Virtuti Militari, 1st class (Poland)
Cross of Grunwald, 1st class (Poland)
Order of Polonia Restituta, 1st class (Poland)
Golden Order of the Partisan Star (Yugoslavia)
Order of the People's Republic of Bulgaria, 1st class (Bulgaria)
Order of Klement Gottwald (Czechoslovakia)
Order of the White Lion, 1st class (Czechoslovakia)
Military Order of the White Lion, 1st class (Czechoslovakia)
War Cross 1939–1945 (Czechoslovakia)
Order of Merit of the Hungarian People Republic (Hungary)
Order of the Hungarian Freedom (Hungary)
Honorary Knight Commander, Order of the Bath (UK, 1997)
Military Cross (UK)
Grand Officer of the Legion of Honour (France)
Croix de guerre 1939–1945 (France)
Chief Commander of the Legion of Merit (US)
Medal of Sino-Soviet Friendship (China)

Military offices
Preceded by (none)	Supreme Commander of the Unified Armed Forces of the Warsaw Treaty Organization; 1955–1960	Succeeded by Andrei Grechko
