= Vladimir Sviridov (military commander) =

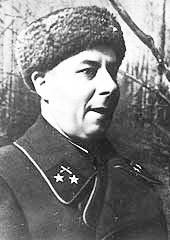
Vladimir Petrovich Sviridov

Vladimir Petrovich Sviridov (Russian: Владимир Петрович Свиридов; Belarusian: Уладзімір Пятровіч Свірыдаў; December 7, 1897 – May 3, 1963) was a Soviet military commander and lieutenant general of artillery, who played an important role in the Soviet occupation of Central Europe after the War.

== Biography ==
=== Early life ===
He was born as the son of a farmer in the village of Kozulichy near Babruysk in Belarus.
From 1916, he served in the Tsarist Army as a platoon commander on the North-Western Front of World War I. He completed artillery courses and became a junior officer of an artillery battery. In the Tsarist Army he achieved the rank of lieutenant.

In February 1918 he started studies at the Pedagogical Institute in Mogilev, but after completing his first year he was drafted into the Red Army. He fought in the Russian Civil War and the War with Poland, as platoon commander, assistant commander and battery commander. After the war, Sviridov attended the Artillery school (1922), the Frunze Military Academy (1930) and the Military Academy of the General Staff of the Armed Forces of the Soviet Union, where he graduated in 1938.
Between 1938-1941, he was commander of the artillery, of the Belorussian Special Military District, Central Asian and Leningrad Military District. Since June 4, 1940, he was a Major General of Artillery.

=== World War II ===
When the war with Germany broke out, he was Artillery commander of the Northern Front, and in October 1941 Deputy Artillery Commander of the Leningrad Front.
From November 1941, he became commander of the 55th Army until December 1943, when he took over command of the 67th Army. On August 30, 1943 he was appointed Lieutenant General. On March 4, 1944, he was seriously injured and from the end of March 1944; he commanded the 42nd Army on the Leningrad Front and later the 2nd and 3rd Baltic Fronts.
The troops under his command took part in breaking the Blockade of Leningrad, the Leningrad–Novgorod Offensive, the Pskov-Ostrov Offensive, the Riga Offensive (1944) and in the fighting in the Courland Pocket.

=== After the War ===
Between July 1945 and November 1947, he was Deputy Chairman of the Control Committee in Hungary, and between January 1948 and April 1949 commander of the Special Mechanized Army.
In April 1949, he was appointed commander-in-chief of the Central Group of Forces in Central Europe, a post he would hold until June 1953.
At the same time, he was also High Commissioner of the Soviet zone of occupation in Austria.

In December 1954 he was recalled to Russia and became Deputy Commander of the Odessa Military District, until March 1957, when retired.

== Sources ==
- Generals.dk
- Encyclopedia.mil.ru/encyclopedia.mil (in Russian)
