= Mishkino, Baltachevsky District, Republic of Bashkortostan =

Mishkino Мишкино
- Village
- Location within Bashkortostan Location within Russia
- Coordinates: 55°57′N 56°15′E
- Country: Russia
- Region: Bashkortostan
- District: Baltachevsky District
- Time zone: UTC+5:00

Mishkino (Russian: Мишкино; Bashkir: Мишкә, Mişkä) is a rural locality (a village) in Yalangachevsky Selsoviet, Baltachevsky District, Bashkortostan, Russia. The population was 326 as of 2010. There are 4 streets.

== Geography ==
Mishkino is located 32 km southeast of Starobaltachevo (the district's administrative centre) by road. Yalangachevo is the nearest rural locality.
