= Mishkino, Uchalinsky District, Republic of Bashkortostan =

Mishkino Мишкино
- Village
- Location within Bashkortostan Location within Russia
- Coordinates: 53°59′N 59°06′E
- Country: Russia
- Region: Bashkortostan
- District: Uchalinsky District
- Time zone: UTC+5:00

Mishkino (Russian: Мишкино; Bashkir: Мишкә, Mişkä) is a rural locality (a village) in Nauruzovsky Selsoviet, Uchalinsky District, Bashkortostan, Russia. The population was 86 as of 2010. There are 2 streets.

== Geography ==
Mishkino is located 57 km southwest of Uchaly (the district's administrative centre) by road. Moskovo is the nearest rural locality.
