= Krasny Bor, Tosnensky District, Leningrad Oblast =

Krasny Bor Красный Бор
- Urban-type settlement
- Interactive map of Krasny Bor
- Location of Krasny Bor Krasny Bor (Leningrad Oblast)
- Coordinates: 59°40′N 30°41′E
- Country: Russia
- Federal subject: Leningrad Oblast
- Administrative district: Tosnensky District
- Urban-type settlement status since: 1935

Population (2010 Census)
  - Total: 5,033
  - Estimate (2024): 4,359 (−13.4%)

Municipal status
  - Municipal district: Tosnensky Municipal District
  - Urban settlement: Krasnoborskoye Urban Settlement
  - Capital of: Krasnoborskoye Urban Settlement
- Time zone: UTC+3 (MSK)
- Postal code: 187015
- OKTMO ID: 41648154051
- Website: красный-бор.рф

Krasny Bor (Russian: Кра́сный Бор) is an urban locality (an urban-type settlement) in Tosnensky District of Leningrad Oblast, Russia, located 20 kilometers (12 mi) southeast of the center of St. Petersburg. Population: 5,033 (2010 census); 4,877 (2002 census); 5,791 (1989 Soviet census).

== History ==
Popovka railway station was open in 1874. It was a part of Tsarskoselsky Uyezd of Saint Petersburg Governorate. On November 20, 1918 the uyezd was renamed Detskoselsky. On August 12, 1922 Detskoselsky Uyezd was merged with Petergofsky Uyezd to form Gatchinsky Uyezd (since 1923, Trotsky Uyezd). On February 7, 1927, Popovka was transferred to Leningradsky Uyezd. The governorate was renamed Petrogradsky in 1913 and Leningradsky in 1924.

On August 1, 1927, the uyezds were abolished and Kolpinsky District, with the administrative center in the town of Kolpino, was established. The governorates were also abolished, and the district was a part of Leningrad Okrug of Leningrad Oblast. The station of Popovka became a part of Kolpinsky District. On July 23, 1930, the okrugs were abolished as well, and the districts were directly subordinated to the oblast. On August 19, 1930 the district was abolished. Krasny Bor became a part of newly established Tosnensky District. On August 20, 1935 Krasny Bor, which had the status of suburban settlement, was upgraded to urban-type settlement. During World War II, Krasny Bor was occupied by German troops. In 1943, the Battle of Krasny Bor took place here.

== Economy ==
=== Industry ===
The main industrial enterprise in Krasny Bor is a factory producing pipes. The Krasny Bor transmitter, a large facility for AM broadcasting, is located in the settlement. Broadcasting from Krasny Bor was discontinued on January 1, 2013.

=== Transportation ===
Krasny Bor is essentially a suburb of Saint Petersburg and is included into the transport infrastructure of the city. The Moscow – Saint Petersburg Railway passes through Krasny Bor. Popovka railway station is located in the settlement and has suburban connections with Moskovsky railway station in Saint Petersburg.

The M10 highway, connecting Saint Petersburg and Moscow, passes west of the settlement. Krasny Bor has access to the highway. Other roads connect it with Nikolskoye and with Kolpino.

== Culture and recreation ==
Krasny Bor contains three cultural heritage monuments classified as cultural and historical heritage of local significance. These are mass graves of soldiers killed during the Russian Civil War and during World War II.
