= Captain general of the Army =

Spanish Army rank equivalent to field marshal

Captain General Capitán General
- Rank flag

- Shoulder insignia
- Country: Spain
- Service branch: Spanish Army
- Abbreviation: CG
- Rank: Five-star rank
- NATO rank code: OF-10
- Non-NATO rank: O-11
- Formation: c. 1714
- Next lower rank: General of the Army
- Equivalent ranks: Captain general of the Navy (N); Captain general of the Air Force (AF)

Captain General (Spanish: Capitán General) has been the highest rank in the Spanish Army (Ejército de Tierra) since the 18th century. A five-star rank with NATO code OF-10, it is equivalent to a field marshal of the armies of numerous countries, a general of the Army of the United States, a captain general of the Spanish Navy (Armada Española) or a Captain general of the Air Force in the Spanish Air and Space Force (Ejército del Aire y del Espacio). A Captain General's insignia consists of two command sticks under five four-pointed stars below the Royal Crown.

A personal rank of captain general was created in the Spanish Army (and Navy) as the highest rank in the hierarchy, not unlike the Marechal de France. Since King Charles IV's reign (1788–1808), the monarchs used captain general insignia when wearing uniform. Briefly abolished by the Second Spanish Republic (except one honorary promotion), it was restored during the dictatorship of Francisco Franco; Franco himself was the only holder of this rank. Since the restoration of the monarchy in 1975, the effective rank was reserved to the reigning monarch. A few posthumous honorary promotions and honorary promotions of retired officers to this rank were also made, such as José Moscardó Ituarte (1956), Agustín Muñoz Grandes (1957), Camilo Alonso Vega (1969) or Manuel Gutiérrez Mellado (1994). Some members of the Spanish Royal Family were promoted to the rank after periods of service and Queen Isabella II appointed her consort, Francis, Duke of Cádiz (1846). Two foreign monarchs, Edward VII of the United Kingdom and Wilhelm II, German Emperor, and four distinguished foreign military officers also held the honour.

== Insignia history ==
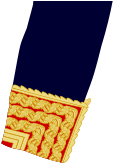
19th century

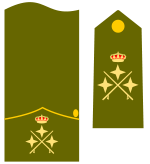
Early 20th century – 1931

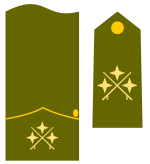
1931–1939 declared to be abolished

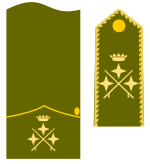
1939–1943

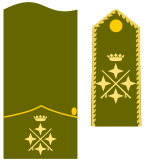
1943–1975

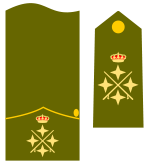
1975–1986

1986–1999

1999–present

== List of Captains general ==
Date of promotion	Image	Name and style	Dead/Annulled	Notes
1763		Pedro Pablo Abarca de Bolea, 10th Count of Aranda	† 1798	
1777		Pedro Antonio de Cevallos Cortés y Calderón	† 1778	
1783		Louis des Balbes de Berton de Crillon 4th Duke of Crillon and 1st Duke of Mahon	† 1796	
14 December 1788		King Charles IV	19 March 1808 (Abdication)	Ex officio
1793		Antonio Ricardos y Carrillo de Albornoz	† 13 March 1794	
25 May 1793		Manuel Godoy y Álvarez de Faria, Prince of the Peace	19 March 1808	Generalissimo (1801–1808)
1794		Honorato Ignacio de Glimes de Brabante, Count Glimes de Brabante	† 1804	
1794		José Carlos Álvarez de Bohórquez y Molina, Marquis of Ruchena	† ?	
1794		Martín Antonio Álvarez de Sotomayor y Flores, Count of Colomera	† 1819	
1795		Manuel de Negrete y de la Torre, Count of Campo de Alange	† 1818	
1795		José Ramón de Urrutia y de las Casas	† 1803	
1799		Miguel de la Grúa Talamanca, 1st Marquis of Branciforte	† 1812	
1806		Ventura Caro y Fontes	† 1809	
19 March 1808		King Ferdinand VII	† 29 September 1833 (Note: He abdicated on 6 May 1808 and kept under guard in France. Restored in 1814.)	Ex officio
1808		Vicente María de Vera de Aragón y Enríquez de Navarra, Duke of La Roca and Marquis of Sofraga	† 1813	
1808		Francisco Javier Castaños, 1st Duke of Bailén	† 24 September 1852	
1808		Vicente María de Acevedo y Pola-Navia	† November 1808	
1808		Joaquín de Navia-Osorio y Miranda, Marquis of Santa Cruz de Marcenado and Viscount of Puerto	† 1816	
1809		Rafael Vasco y del Campo, Count of la Conquista de las Islas Batanes	† 1810	
1809		Gregorio García de Cuesta y Fernández de Celis	† 26 November 1811	
1809		José Rebolledo de Palafox y Melci, 1st Duke of Zaragoza	† 15 February 1847	
1809		Ventura Escalante y Bruen	† 1811	
1810		Pedro Caro, 3rd Marquis of La Romana	† 23 January 1811	
1811		Arthur Wellesley, 1st Duke of Wellington	† 14 September 1852	Ad honorem
1811		William Beresford, 1st Viscount Beresford	† 8 January 1854	Ad honorem
1811		Joaquín Blake y Joyes	† 27 April 1827	
1811		Claude-Anne de Rouvroy de Saint Simon, Marquis of Saint Simon and Montblerú	† 27 February 1819	Émigré and Spanish Grandee.
1816		José Manuel de Ezpeleta, 1st Count of Ezpeleta de Beire	† 1823	
1816		Pedro Mendinueta y Múzquiz	† 1825	
1816		Ramón de Osorio y Patiño, 4th Marquis of Castelar	† 1817	
1816		José Fernando de Abascal y Sousa, 1st Marquis of La Concordia	† 31 July 1821	
1823		Francisco Javier de Elio y Olondriz	† 1822	
1823		Francisco de Eguía, 1st Count of the Real Aprecio	† 6 January 1827	President of the Provisional Board of Spain and the Indies
1824		Pedro de Alcántara Álvarez de Toledo, 13th Duke of the Infantado	† 27 November 1841	President of Council of Castile (1808–1809 and 1814–1823); President of the Regency Board (1823); Secretary of state (1825–1826)
1824		Joaquín Ibáñez, Baron de Eroles	† 22 August 1825	
1825		Juan de Henestrosa y Orcasitas	† 1831	
1827		José Miguel de Carvajal-Vargas, 2nd Duke of San Carlos	† 1828	Secretary of state (1814)
1831		Francisco Fernández de Córdoba, 1st Duke of Alagón	† 1841	
1 May 1838		Baldomero Espartero, Prince of Vergara	† 8 January 1879	Regent of Spain (1840–1843); Minister of War (29 July-30 August 1837 and 16 December 1837–1838); Prime Minister (18 August-18 October 1837, 1840–1841 and 1854–1856)
9 October 1841		José Ramón Rodil, 1st Marquis of Rodil	† 20 February 1853	Viceroy of Navarre (1 July-2 October 1834); Minister of War (27 April-15 May and 20 August-26 November 1836, and 1842–1843); Prime Minister (1842–1843)
19 August 1843		Juan José Nieto y Aguilar, 2nd Marquis of Monsalud	† 28 February 1851	
5 January 1844		Prudencio de Guadalfajara y Aguilera, duque de Castroterreño	† 16 June 1855	Minister of War (August–September 1835)
5 January 1844		Ramón María Narváez, 1st Duke of Valencia	† 23 April 1868	Minister of State (1844, 1846 and 1847); Minister of War (1844–1846, 1846, 1847 and 1866–1868); Prime Minister (1844–1846, 1846, 1847–1849, 1849–1851, 1856–1857, 1864–1865 and 1866–1868)
10 October 1846		Francis, King Consort	19 September 1868 (Abolition of monarchy) † 17 April 1902	Ex officio (As consort of Queen Isabella II); Reinstated ad honorem after 1874.
21 May 1849		Manuel Gutiérrez de la Concha e Irigoyen, 1st Marquis of Duero	† 27 June 1874	
19 November 1852		Pedro Villacampa y Maza de Lizana	† 27 December 1854	
30 July 1854		Evaristo Fernández de San Miguel y Valledor, 1st Duke of San Miguel	† 29 May 1862	
30 July 1854		Leopoldo O'Donnell, 1st Duke of Tetuan	† 5 November 1867	Prime Minister (14 July-12 October 1856, 1858–1863 and 1865–1866); Minister of War (30 July-29 November 1854, 1858–1863 and 1865–1868); Minister of State (30 June-2 de July 1858); Minister of the Navy (25–27 November 1858); Minister of Overseas (17 January-2 March 1863)
18 July 1856		Francisco Serrano, 1st Duke of la Torre	† 25 November 1885	Prime Minister (1868–1869, 4 January-24 July 1871, 26 May-13 June 1872, 3 January-26 February 1874); Regent (1869–1871); President of the Executive Power of the Republic (3 January-30 December 1874)
5 January 1858		Antoine, Duke of Montpensier	December 1870 (Note: Accession of King Amadeo.)	Brother-in-law of Queen Isabella II
10 October 1867		Juan de la Pezuela y Cevallos, 1st Count of Cheste	† 1 November 1906	
24 April 1868		Manuel Pavía y Lacy, 1st Marquis de Novaliches	† 22 October 1896	
24 April 1868		José Gutiérrez de la Concha, 1st Marquis of Havana	† 5 November 1895	Minister of Overseas (20 May-6 August 1863 and 29 November 1863–1864); Minister of the Navy (19 June-16 July 1863 and 19–21 September 1868); Minister of War (1863–1864 and 19 September-8 October 1868); Prime Minister (19 September-8 October 1868)
30 September 1868		Juan Prim, 1st Marquis of los Castillejos	† 30 December 1870	Minister of War (1868–1870); Prime Minister (1869–1870)
16 November 1870		King Amadeo	11 February 1873 (Abdication)	Ex officio: Captain General of the Navy (1870–1873)
1 May 1874		Juan de Zavala, 1st Marquis of Sierra Bullones	† 29 December 1879	Minister of state (1855–1856); Minister of the Navy (1860–1863); Minister of War (8 April-26 May 1872 and 3 January-29 June 1874); Prime Minister (26 February-3 September 1874)
29 December 1874		King Alfonso XII	† 25 November 1885	Ex officio; Captain General of the Navy (1874–1885)
21 August 1875		Ramón Cabrera y Griñó, 1st duke of the Maestrazgo	† 24 May 1877	Ad honorem
27 March 1876		Jenaro Quesada, 1st Marquis of Miravalles	† 19 January 1889	Ad honorem; Prime Minister (7 March-9 December 1879)
27 March 1876		Arsenio Martínez-Campos y Antón	† 23 September 1892	Ad honorem
7 July 1878		Joaquín Jovellar y Soler	† 16 April 1892	Ad honorem
29 July 1892		Manuel Pavía y Rodríguez de Alburquerque	† 4 January 1895	Ad honorem
22 January 1895		José López Domínguez	† 17 October 1911	Ad honorem; Prime Minister (6 July-30 November 1906)
16 May 1895		Ramón Blanco y Erenas, 1st Marquis de Peña Plata	† 4 April 1906	Ad honorem
14 November 1895		Fernando Primo de Rivera y Sobremonte, 1st Marquis of Estella	† 23 May 1921	Ad honorem; Minister of War (1907–1909 and June–October 1917)
17 May 1902		King Alfonso XIII	14 April 1931 (Second Spanish Republic established) (Note: On 14 April 1931 Alfonso XIII renounced as head of state but did not formally abdicate.)	Ex officio; Captain General of the Navy (1902–1931)
7 April 1907		Edward VII, King of the United Kingdom	† 6 May 1910	Ad honorem; Monarch of the British Dominions and Emperor of India
23 January 1910		Camilo García de Polavieja y del Castillo-Negrete, 1st Marquis Polavieja	† 15 January 1914	Ad honorem
23 January 1910		Valeriano Weyler Nicolau, 1st Duke of Rubí and Marquis of Tenerife	† 20 October 1930	Ad honorem; Minister of War (1901–1902, 23 June-1 December 1905 and 1906–1907); Minister of the Navy (1 October-1 December 1905)
23 January 1910		Wilhelm II, German Emperor	† 4 June 1941	Ad honorem; Monarch until 9 November 1918.
12 March 1911		Marcelo de Azcárraga y Palmero	† 30 May 1915	Ad honorem; Minister of War (1890–1892, 1895–1897 and 1899–1900); Prime Minister (8 August-4 October 1897, 1900–1901 and 1904–1905); Minister of the Navy (23–31 October 1900)
17 May 1921		Carlos of Bourbon-Two Sicilies, Infante of Spain	14 April 1931 † 11 November 1949	Ad honorem; Reinstated ad honorem in 1939.
2 May 1931		Francisco Aguilera y Egea	† 19 May 1931	Ad honorem; Minister of War (19 April-11 June 1917)
July 20, 1936		José Sanjurjo y Sacanell, 1st Marquis of the Rif	—	Posthumous promotion
18 July 1938		Francisco Franco Bahamonde	† 20 November 1975	Ex officio (As Head of State) (Note: Named himself.); Captain General of the Navy (1938 (Note: At Civil War until 1 April 1939.)-1975) and the Air Force (1939–1975); Generalissimo (1936-1975)
March 22, 1947		Miguel Primo de Rivera y Orbaneja, 2nd Marquis of Estella	—	Posthumous promotion; Prime Minister (1923–1930)
March 24, 1951		José Enrique Varela Iglesias, 1st Marquis of San Fernando de Varela	—	Posthumous promotion; Minister of the Army (1939–1942)
October 21, 1952		Juan Yagüe Blanco, 1st Marquis of San Leonardo de Yagüe	—	Posthumous promotion; Air Minister (1939–1940)
April 12, 1956		José Moscardó Ituarte, 1st Count of the Alcázar de Toledo	—	Posthumous promotion
27 February 1957		Agustín Muñoz Grandes	† 11 July 1970	Ad honorem; Minister of the Army (1951–1957); Deputy Prime Minister (1962–1967)
23 March 1962		Fidel Dávila Arrondo	† 22 March 1962	Ad honorem; President of the State Technical Board (1936–1937) (Note: At Civil War.); Minister of the National Defence (1937–1939); Minister of the Army (1945–1951)
29 October 1969		Camilo Alonso Vega	† 1 July 1971	Ad honorem; Minister of Interior (1957–1969)
20 November 1975 (Note: Monarch since 22 November 1975.)		King Juan Carlos I	Active until 19 June 2014. (Abdication)	Ex officio; Retired since 19 June 2014; Captain General of the Navy and the Air Force
24 July 1994		Manuel Gutiérrez Mellado, 1st Marquis Gutiérrez-Mellado	† 15 December 1995	Ad honorem; Minister of Defence (1977–1979); Deputy Prime Minister for Defence (1976–1981)
19 June 2014		King Felipe VI	Present	Ex officio; Captain General of the Navy and the Air and Space Force

== See also ==
- Army of Spain
- Captain general
- Captain general of the Air Force
- Captain general of the Navy
