= Captain general of the Navy =

Military rank of Spanish Navy OF-10

Captain general of the Navy Capitán general de la Armada
- Rank flag

- Sleeve and shoulder insignia
- Country: Spain
- Service branch: Spanish Navy
- Abbreviation: CGN
- Rank group: Flag officer
- NATO rank code: OF-10
- Formation: c. 1714
- Next lower rank: Admiral general
- Equivalent ranks: Captain general (Army); Captain general (Air and Space Force)

Captain general of the Navy (Spanish: Capitán general de la Armada) is the highest naval officer rank of the Spanish Navy, rated OF-10 with the NATO ranking system. The routine honorary appointments formally ceased in 1999. The rank of captain general of the Navy is equivalent to an admiral of the fleet in many nations, a captain general of the Spanish Army or a Captain general of the Air Force in the Spanish Air and Space Force.

A peculiar usage of the term captain general arose in the Spanish Navy of the 16th century. A captain general was appointed by the king as the leader of a fleet (although the term 'squadron' is more appropriate, as most galleon fleets rarely consisted of more than a dozen vessels, not counting escorted merchantmen), with full jurisdictional powers. The fleet second-in-command was the admiral, an officer appointed by the capitan-general and responsible for the seaworthiness of the squadron.

Since King Amadeo's reign (1871–1873), the monarchs used captain general of the Navy rank and insignia as Commander-in-chief. Briefly abolished by the Second Spanish Republic, it was restored in 1938 during the regime of Francisco Franco, a General of the Army. Since 19th century honorary promotions of retired admirals to this rank were also made, such as the prime ministers Juan Bautista Aznar-Cabañas (1928) and Luis Carrero Blanco (1973), the only posthumous promotion. Infante Juan, Count of Barcelona, claimant to the Spanish throne (1941–1977) and father of King Juan Carlos, was also made honorary captain general of the Spanish Navy in 1992.

== List ==
| Date of promotion | Image | Name | Dead/Annulled | Notes | Ref. |
|---|---|---|---|---|---|
| 1750 | | Juan José Navarro, 1st Marquess of Victoria | † 5 February 1772 | 1st general captain of the Navy | |
| 1783 | | Luis de Córdova y Córdova | † 29 September 1796 | 2nd general captain of the Navy | |
| 1789 | | Pedro Fitz-James Stuart | † 23 July 1791 | 3rd general captain of the Navy | |
| 1792 | | Antonio Valdés y Fernández Bazán | † 4 April 1816 | 4th general captain of the Navy; Knight of the Order of the Golden Fleece | |
| 1794 | | Francisco Javier Everardo-Tilly | † 11 December 1795 | 5th general captain of the Navy | |
| 1796 | | Antonio González de Arce | † 23 February 1798 | 6th general captain of the Navy | |
| 1798 | | Manuel Antonio Flórez y Maldonado | † 23 March 1798 | 7th general captain of the Navy | |
| 1798 | | Juan Cayetano de Lángara y Huarte | † 18 January 1806 | 8th general captain of the Navy | |
| 1802 | | José Solano y Bote | † 24 April 1806 | 9th general captain of the Navy | |
| 1805 | | Francisco de Borja y Poyo | † 10 June 1808 | 10th general captain of the Navy | |
| 1805 | | Francisco Gil de Taboada y Lemos | † 1809 | 11th general captain of the Navy | |
| 9 November 1805 | | Federico Gravina | † 9 March 1806 | 12th general captain of the Navy | |
| 3 November 1808 | | Félix Ignacio de Tejada | † 20 February 1817 | 13th general captain of the Navy | |
| 24 February 1817 | | Ignacio María de Álava | † 26 May 1817 | 14th general captain of the Navy | |
| 6 June 1817 | | Juan María Villavicencio y de la Serna | † 25 April 1830 | 15th general captain of the Navy | |
| 1 May 1830 | | Juan Ruiz de Apodaca y Eliza | † 11 January 1835 | 16th general captain of the Navy | |
| 25 January 1835 | | Cayetano Valdés y Flores | † 16 February 1835 | 17th general captain of the Navy | |
| 16 January 1836 | | Francisco Javier de Uriarte y Borja | † 29 November 1843 | 18th general captain of the Navy | |
| 12 February 1843 | | José Sartorio | † 30 December 1843 | 19th general captain of the Navy | |
| 2 June 1843 (Note: Supernumerary captain general of the Navy until 30 December 1843.) | | Ramón Romay | † 23 May 1849 | 20th general captain of the Navy; Minister of the Navy (28 February-20 April 1823) | |
| 15 September 1847 (Note: Supernumerary captain general of the Navy until 23 May 1849.) | | José Rodríguez de Arias | † 26 January 1852 | 21st general captain of the Navy | |
| 17 February 1852 | | Francisco Javier de Ulloa | † 24 November 1855 | 22nd general captain of the Navy; Secretary of the Navy (1832–1833) | |
| 28 November 1855 | | Dionisio Capaz | † 27 December 1855 | 23rd general captain of the Navy; Minister of the Navy (1822–1823 and 11–16 September 1840) | |
| 13 February 1856 | | Francisco Armero y Fernández de Peñaranda | † 1 July 1856 | 24th general captain of the Navy; Lieutenant general of the Army; Minister of the Navy, Commerce and Overseas Governance (1840, 1844–1846 and 1846–1847); Minister of War (1846 and 1857–1858); Minister of Governance (1857–1858); Minister of the Navy (1851–1852 and 1864–1865); Prime Minister (1857–1858); Last surviving Spanish veteran officer of the Battle of Trafalgar | |
| 24 November 1858 (Note: Supernumerary captain general of the Navy until 1866. Rank replaced by Admiral of the Spanish Navy in 1869.) | | Casimiro Vigodet | † 2 January 1872 | Minister of the Navy (1837); Knight of the Order of the Golden Fleece | |
| 16 November 1870 | | Amadeo de Saboya | 11 February 1873 (First Spanish Republic established) | Ex officio; Captain general of the Army (1870–1873) | |
| 5 September 1872 (Note: Promoted as Admiral of the Spanish Royal Navy.) | | Juan José Martínez de Espinosa y Tacón | † 14 October 1875 | | |
| 29 December 1874 | | Alfonso de Borbón y Borbón | † 25 November 1885 | Ex officio; Captain general of the Army (1874–1885) | |
| 24 August 1875 | | Joaquín Gutiérrez de Rubalcava | † 3 April 1881 | Ad honorem; Minister of the Navy (17 January – 1 March 1864 and 1866–1867); 1st Marquis Rubalcaba with sucesion (1878) (Note: Vide Rubalcava.) | |
| 18 April 1881 | | Luis Hernández-Pinzón Álvarez | † 22 February 1891 | Ad honorem | |
| 27 February 1891 | | Guillermo Chacón Maldonado | † 28 March 1899 | Ad honorem; Knight of the Order of the Golden Fleece | |
| 15 April 1899 | | Carlos Valcárcel y Ussel de Gimbarda | † 23 April 1903 | Ad honorem; Minister of the Navy (1883–1884); Knight of the Order of the Golden Fleece | |
| 17 May 1902 | | Alfonso de Borbón y Habsburgo-Lorena | 14 April 1931 (Second Spanish Republic established) (Note: On 14 April 1931 Alfonso XIII renounced as head of state but did not formally abdicate.) | Ex officio; Captain general of the Army (1902–1931) | |
| 30 April 1903 | | José María Beránger | † 23 January 1907 | Ad honorem; Minister of the Navy (1870–1871, 1872–1873, 1885–1886, 1890–1891, 11 March – 11 December 1892 and 1895–1897) | |
| 21 February 1910 (Note: Admiral of the Spanish Royal Navy until 10 January 1912, when the traditional rank of Captain General of the Navy was recovered.) | | Juan Bautista Viniegra | † 21 February 1918 | Ad honorem; Knight of the Order of the Golden Fleece | |
| 17 March 1918 | | José Pidal Rebollo | † 4 May 1920 | Ad honorem; Minister of the Navy (1911–1912 and 23 March – 27 July 1918) | |
| 11 May 1920 | | José María Chacón y Pery | † 13 April 1922 | Ad honorem; Minister of the Navy (1918–1919) | |
| 22 April 1922 | | Ricardo Fernández de la Puente y Patrón | † 23 October 1928 | Ad honorem; President of the Supreme War and Navy Council | |
| 30 October 1928 | | Juan Bautista Aznar y Cabañas | † 19 February 1933 | Ad honorem; Minister of the Navy (16 February – 15 September 1923); Prime Minister (18 February – 14 April 1931); Knight of the Order of the Golden Fleece | |
| 18 July 1938 | | Francisco Franco y Bahamonde | † 20 November 1975 | Ex officio (As Head of state) (Note: Named himself.); Captain general of the Army (1938 (Note: At Civil War until 1 April 1939.)–1975) and Air captain general (1939–1975); Generalissimo (1936–1975) | |
| 21 December 1973 | | Luis Carrero y Blanco | — | Posthumous promotion: Deputy Prime Minister (1967–1973); Prime Minister (9 June – 20 December 1973) | |
| 20 November 1975 (Note: Monarch since 22 November 1975.) | | Juan Carlos de Borbón y Borbón | Active until 19 June 2014 (Abdication) | Ex officio; Retired since 19 June 2014; Captain general of the Army and Air captain general | |
| 5 December 1992 | | Juan de Borbón y Battenberg | † 1 April 1993 | Ad honorem; Infante of Spain; Claim to the Spanish throne (1941–1977) | |
| 19 June 2014 | | Felipe de Borbón y Grecia | Present | Ex officio; Captain general of the Army and Air captain general | |

== See also ==
- Captain general
- Captain general of the Army
- Captain general of the Air Force
- Spanish Navy
