= Ángel Salas Larrazábal =

Spanish military officer (1906–1994)

Captain General of the Air Force Ángel Salas Larrazábal
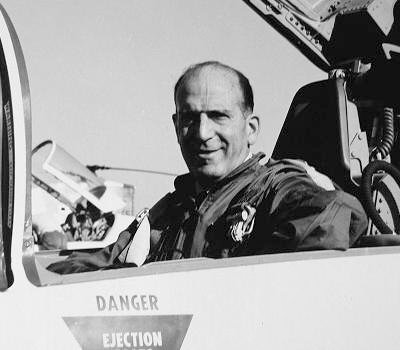
- Salas in a North American F-86 Sabre
- Born: 1 October 1906; Orduña, Spain
- Died: 19 July 1994 (aged 87) Madrid, Spain
- Allegiance: Kingdom of Spain; Second Spanish Republic; Nationalist faction; Nazi Germany; Francoist Spain
- Branch: Spanish Army; Spanish Air Force; Luftwaffe
- Service years: 1921–1976
- Rank: Lieutenant general Captain general of the Air Force (ad honorem)
- Commands: Blue Squadron
- Conflicts: Asturian Revolution of 1934; Spanish Civil War; Battle of Teruel; Battle of the Ebro; Levante Offensive; Siege of Madrid; World War II; Eastern Front; Operation Barbarossa
- Spouse: Rosario Collantes Álvarez-Buylla (m. 1939)
- Children: 7

Interim leader of Spain
- In office 20 November 1975 – 22 November 1975 Serving with Alejandro Rodríguez de Valcárcel and Pedro Cantero Cuadrado
- Preceded by: Francisco Franco (as Head of State)
- Succeeded by: Juan Carlos I (as King)

Senator of Spain
- In office 15 June 1977 – 2 January 1979

Ángel Salas Larrazábal (1 October 1906 – 19 July 1994) was a Spanish military officer, military attaché, and flying ace. He fought for the Nationalist faction during the Spanish Civil War and was the first commander of the Blue Squadron of World War II during Operation Barbarossa.

Salas began his military career in the Spanish Army as an artilleryman. He joined the Spanish Aviation Corps in 1928 and became a fighter pilot. Salas helped suppress the Asturian Revolution of 1934. While he was assigned to the Spanish protectorate in Morocco, he joined the Nationalists of the Spanish Civil War. He engaged in several aerial battles and became a flying ace. He became the first commander of the Blue Squadron that fought alongside the Luftwaffe during Operation Barbarossa. Salas became a military attaché in 1944 and was a Spanish representative to Nazi Germany, Switzerland, Portugal, and France.

Salas was a flight instructor for the North American F-86 Sabre during the 1950s. He became a member of the Regency Council in 1974 and was one of three people who led Spain in an interim capacity from 20 to 22 November 1975 after the death of General Francisco Franco. In 1991, King Juan Carlos I promoted Salas to captain general of the Air Force ad honorem. Salas died in Madrid on 19 July 1994.

== Early life ==
Ángel Salas Larrazábal was born on 1 October 1906 in Orduña, Spain. His parents were Emerico Salas Orodea and María Jesús Larrazábal Echeguren. At the age of six, four of Salas' younger siblings died within weeks of each other.

== Military career ==
=== Early career ===
Salas enrolled in the Segovia Artillery Academy on 27 July 1921. He was promoted to lieutenant on 10 July 1926 and was assigned to the 2nd Heavy Artillery Regiment in Mérida. He was reassigned to the 1st Foot Artillery Regiment on 10 December 1926. Salas was transferred to the 11th Light Regiment in Burgos in May 1927 before being reassigned to 3rd Battery of the Melilla Field Artillery Group in Spanish Morocco on 5 September 1927.

In January 1928, Salas enrolled in the Four Winds Observer School of the Spanish Aviation Corps. He earned his aircraft observation certification on 14 July 1928 and completed his pilot training at Gamonal Airfield. On 31 January 1929, he was assigned to the aviation corp's Group 3 in Tétouan. On 21 November 1930, Salas became a fighter pilot and assigned to the Martinsyde Squadron in Getafe. He became a part of the Mixed Squadron of the Sahara on August 1934 and flew the Fokker F.VII during the Asturian Revolution of 1934 from 8 to 28 October. Salas survived an accident while piloting a Bréguet 19 on 8 November 1934 near Mogador.

=== Spanish Civil War ===
Salas became a captain in April 1936 and was assigned to Mixed Squadron's Contingency Services. He granted a two-month leave in June 1936 after accumulating 1,625 flying hours. That month, he was authorized to fly to Berlin, Germany for the 1936 Summer Olympics, but before he could carry out the flight, the Spanish Civil War began on 17 July. Salas reported to the Getafe Airfield and was assigned to bomb Melilla in a Bréguet 19 the following day on behalf of the Nationalists. He was arrested in Pamplona but released the following day when General Emilio Mola joined the Nationalists. Salas delivered a message from Mola to General Francisco Franco in Tétouan on 20 July.

Throughout the civil war, Salas flew several aircraft including the de Havilland Dragon Rapide, Fiat CR.32, Heinkel He 51, Junkers Ju 52, and Nieuport-Delage NiD 52. Salas first aerial combat occurred over the Basque Country on 27 July in a Nieuport-Delage NiD 52. He achieved his first aerial victory on 23 August near Teruel. From December 1936 to January 1937, Salas commanded of the 4th Fiat Squadron of the Italian Aviazione Legionaria. In February 1937, Salas oversaw the organization of a squadron of Heinkel He 51 fighters.

On 10 September 1937, Salas became the commander of Group 2-G-3 of the 1st Air Brigade. He led the group in combat during the Battle of Teruel. Salas participated in the Levante Offensive in May 1938. On 2 September 1938, Salas shot down three Tupolev SB bombers. He participated in the Battle of the Ebro in October. Salas was hospitalized in November with a hernia and did not return to service until January 1939. Salas entered Madrid on 28 March 1939. Salas completed 618 combat missions during the civil war, the most of any pilot, and logged 1,215 flight hours.

Salas became the commander of the 21st Fiat Fighter Regiment in September 1939. Salas was promoted to major on 15 February 1940. On 20 March 1940, he became a professor of the 1st General Staff class of the Air Force Academy.

=== World War II ===
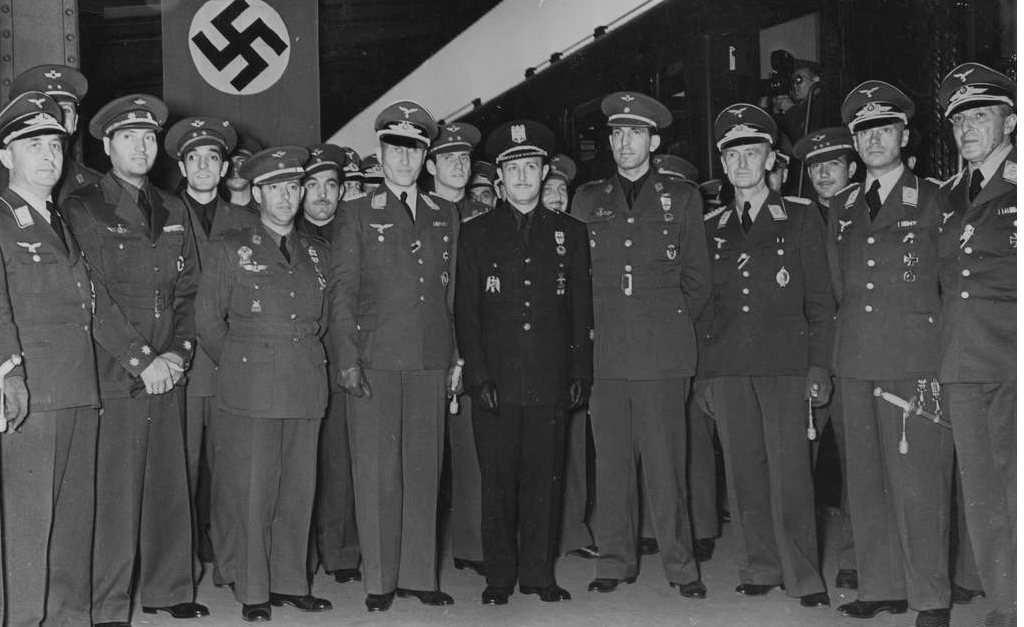
Salas in Berlin in July 1941; he is to ambassador José Finat's (center) left.

After Germany launched Operation Barbarossa against the Soviet Union in June 1941, Spain sent the Blue Division and Blue Squadron to support Germany. Salas was the first commander of the Blue Squadron. The Blue Squadron first saw action on 2 October 1941 as a part of the 27th Assault Group. Salas achieved five aerial victories in his first two weeks of combat. By the end of Operation Barbarossa, Salas had achieved his 24th aerial victory of his career. Salas returned to Spain in February 1942 and he was promoted to lieutenant colonel later that year to recognize his combat accomplishments.

=== Later career ===
Salas was the chief of studies of the Air Force Academy from 1942 to 1944. Salas was assigned as a military attaché to Berlin in 1944 and was accredited to Bern, Budapest, Helsinki, and Stockholm. Salas left Berlin in 1945 as the city was captured by the Soviet Union, after which, he was stationed in Bern. He became an attaché to Lisbon in 1947. The Spanish newspaper EFE described Salas' tenure in Lisbon as having taught "modesty, Spanishness, simplicity, and good work" ("de modestia, de españolismo, de sencillez y buen hacer").

Salas became a colonel in 1951 and visited the United States along with the Spanish minister of the air force. Salas visited Paris in 1952 as a representative of Lieutenant General Juan Vigón to discuss Spain's ascension to NATO. José Rojas Moreno, the Spanish ambassador to France, described Salas in his four-year tenure in Paris as being accomplished in "competence, zeal, discretion, good manners, and professional efficiency" ("su competencia, por su celo, por su discreción, por sus buenos modales, por su eficacia profesional").

When Salas returned to Spain, he became a flight instructor for the North American F-86 Sabre fighter jet. He also became the commander of the Air Defense Forces. Salas was promoted to brigadier general in 1959 and to divisional general in 1963. He also became the deputy commander of the Higher Center for National Defense Studies. Salas was promoted to lieutenant general in 1966 and became the commander of the Strait Air Region and Tactical Aviation. Salas personally led an aerial parade of F-86 Sabres over Madrid on 3 May 1969.

Salas became a member of the Regency Council in 1974 as the longest serving lieutenant general. When Franco died on 20 November 1975, Salas, Alejandro Rodríguez de Valcárcel, and Archbishop Pedro Cantero Cuadrado became the joint interim leaders of Spain until King Juan Carlos I ascended to the throne on 22 November. Salas became an air force reservist in 1976. Juan Carlos I appointed Salas to the Senate of Spain on 15 June 1977 as one of 40 senators appointed for the 1977–1978 term. Salas resigned from the Senate on 2 January 1979 after the constitution of Spain was approved and he withdrew from public life.

== Later life and death ==
On 26 April 1991, Juan Carlos I promoted Salas to Captain General of the Air Force ad honorem in recognition of Salas' "exceptional personal merits" ("méritos personales excepcionales"). Salas died in Madrid on 19 July 1994.

== Personal life ==
Salas met Rosario Collantes Álvarez-Buylla in Navia, Asturias in 1937. They married shortly after the end of the Spanish Civil War on 25 July 1939. The couple had seven children.

== Awards and decorations ==
Salas received the following awards and decorations throughout his career.

Spain

- Order of Charles III, grand cross
- Order of Isabella the Catholic, grand cross
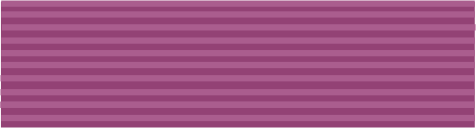
- Order of Cisneros, grand cross
- Military Medal (×2) (1934, 1941)
- Air Medal (1963)
- Cross of Military Merit, 1st class in red (21 October 1935)
- Medal of the Campaign
- Medal of the Russian Campaign

France

- Legion of Honour

Italy

- Order of the Crown of Italy

Portugal

- Military Order of Aviz

United States

- Legion of Merit

== Military ranks ==
Insignia	Rank	Service branch	Date of promotion
Alférez	Alférez	Army	27 July 1921
Lieutenant	Lieutenant	Army	10 July 1926
Captain	Captain	Air Force	April 1936
Commandant	Major	Air Force	15 February 1940
Lieutenant colonel	Lieutenant colonel	Air Force	1942
Colonel	Colonel	Air Force	1951
Brigadier general	Brigadier general	Air Force	1959
Divisional general	Divisional general	Air Force	1963
Lieutenant general	Lieutenant general	Air Force	1966
Captain general	Captain general of the Air Force	Air Force	26 April 1991

== See also ==
- List of Spanish Civil War flying aces
- List of World War II aces from Spain
