= Blue Division Medal =

Blue Division Medal may refer to:

- Blue Division Medal (Germany)
- Medalla de la Campaña de Rusia
