= Captain general of the Air Force =

Highest rank of the Spanish Air Force

Captain General of the Air Force Capitán General del Aire (Spanish)
- Rank flag

- Sleeve and shoulder insignia
- Country: Spain
- Service branch: Spanish Air and Space Force
- Abbreviation: ACG
- Rank group: Flag officer
- Rank: Captain general
- NATO rank code: OF-10
- Formation: 7 October 1939
- Next lower rank: General of the Air
- Equivalent ranks: Captain general (Army); Captain general (Navy)

Captain General of the Air Force (Spanish: Capitán General del Aire or Capitán General del Ejército del Aire) is a five-star air force officer rank and the highest rank of the Spanish Air Force. The five-star NATO rank code is OF-10. The honorary appointments formally ceased in 1999. The rank of Air captain general is equivalent to a Marshal of the Air Force in many nations such as the United Kingdom, a general of the Air Force of the United States, a capitain general of the Spanish Army or the Navy. This rank is reserved to the monarch as Commander-in-chief. An Air captain general's insignia consists of two command sticks under five four-pointed stars below the Royal Crown and a golden string.

The Spanish Air Force as a separated branch of the Spanish Armed Forces was officially established on 7 October 1939, after the Spanish Civil War. Francisco Franco as head of Spanish state and commander-in-chief named himself 1st captain general of the Spanish Air Force. General Ángel Salas Larrazábal, a veteran fighter pilot, has been the only honorary Air captain general (1991-1994).

== List of Captain generals ==
Date of Promotion	Image	Name	Dead/Retirement	Notes
7 October 1939		Francisco Franco	† 20 November 1975	Ex officio (Note: Named himself.); Captain general of the Army and the Navy (1938 (Note: At Civil War until 1 April 1939.)-1975); Generalissimo (1936-1975)
20 November 1975 (Note: Monarch since 22 November 1975)		Juan Carlos I	Active until 19 June 2014 (Abdication)	Ex officio; Retired since 19 June 2014; Captain general of the Army and the Navy
26 April 1991		Ángel Salas Larrazábal	† 19 July 1994	Ad honorem
19 June 2014		Felipe VI	Present	Ex officio; Captain general of the Army and the Navy

== See also ==
- Captain general
- Captain general of the Spanish Army
- Captain general of the Spanish Navy
- Spanish Air Force
