= Blue Squadron =

World War II-era Spanish military unit

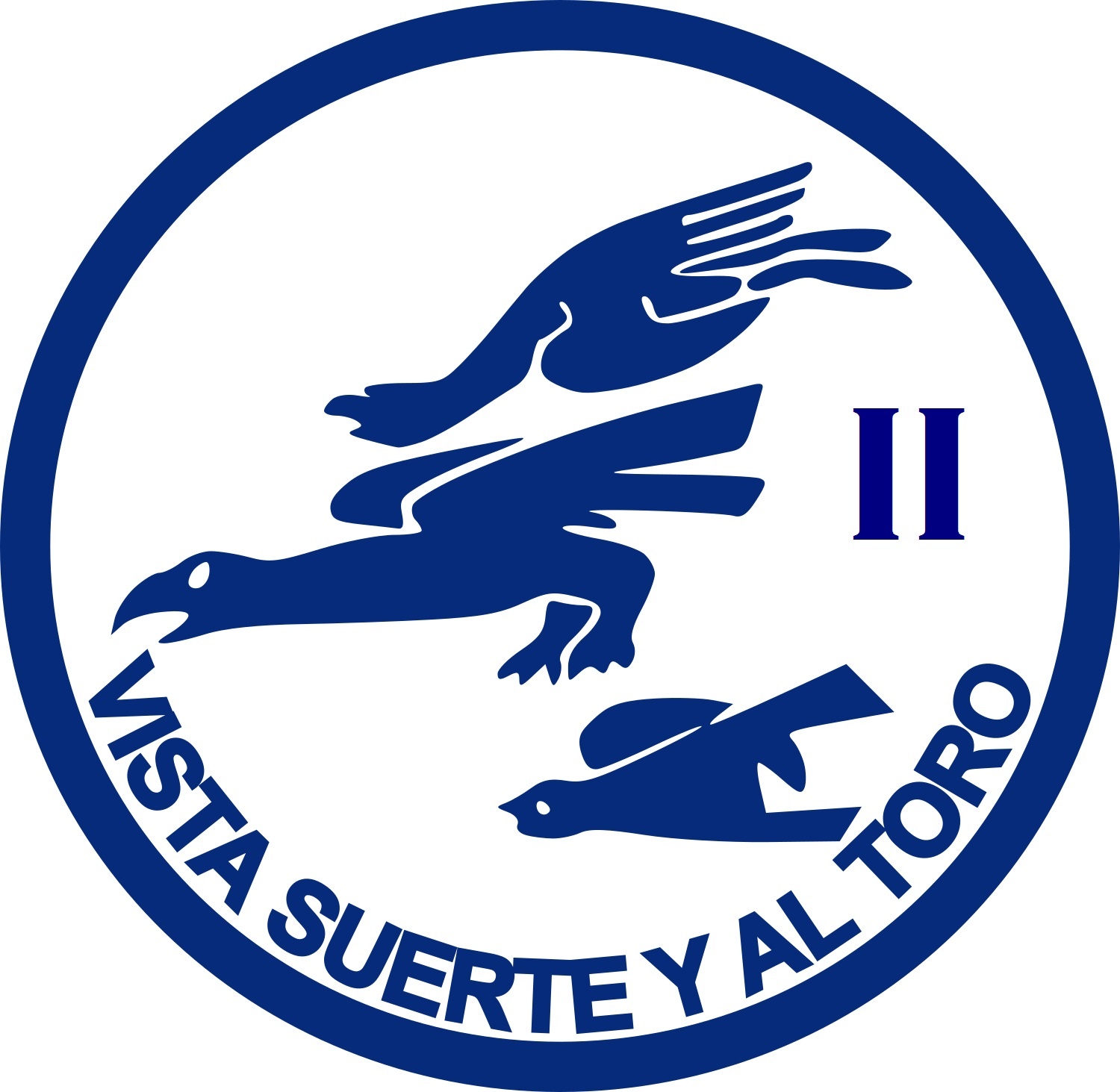
- Emblem of the 1st Blue Squadron
- Active: June 24, 1941 – February 23, 1944
- Country: Spain
- Allegiance: Germany
- Branch: Luftwaffe
- Role: Fighter Squadron
- Part of: JG 27 (1941 - 1942); JG 51 (1942 - 1944)

Aircraft flown
- Bomber: Ju 52; Hs 123; Ju 88 (proposed)
- Fighter: Fw 190; Bf 109

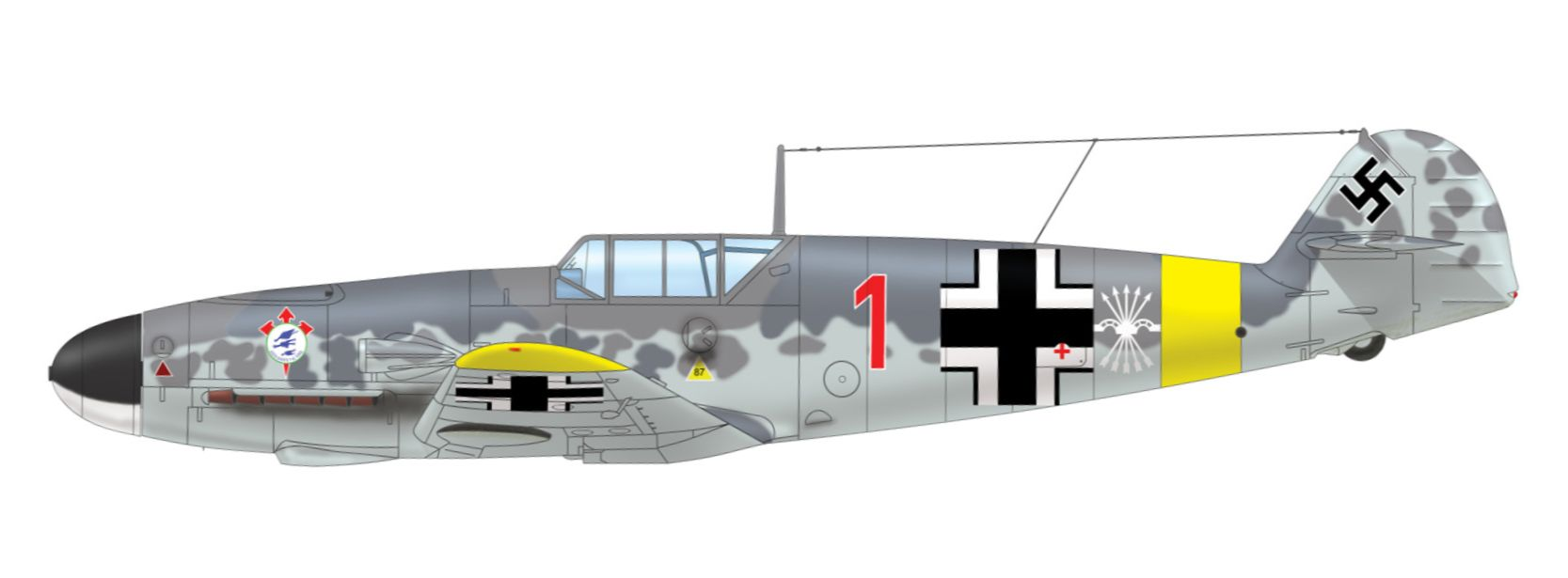
Messerschmitt Bf 109F-2 of the Escuadrilla Azul, 15. (span.)/Jagdgeschwader 51, Winter 1942/1943

The Blue Squadron (Spanish: Escuadrilla Azul, German: 15. Spanische Staffel) was a generic name given to the group of volunteer pilots and ground crews recruited from the Spanish Air Force that fought on the side of Germany on the Eastern Front, during the Second World War. The "Blue Patrol" was a counterpart offered by Francisco Franco to Nazi Germany for its help with the Condor Legion during the Spanish Civil War.

Between September 1941 and May 1943 five Spanish squadrons rotated through the Eastern Front, attached to Luftwaffe fighter wings Jagdgeschwader 27 and Jagdgeschwader 51.

Flying Messerschmitt Bf 109 fighters and Focke-Wulf Fw 190 fighter-bombers, the Spaniards were credited with destroying more than 160 Soviet aircraft in nearly two years, while losing 20 pilots killed, missing, or captured. The unit remained in central Russia, despite requests by Agustín Muñoz Grandes that they be attached to the Blue Division, until their withdrawal in 1943.

The First Blue Squadron was assembled in Spain in July 1941 and remained for two months at elite Jagdfliegerschule No. 1 in Werneuchen, near Berlin, where they spent two months training with Bf 109 D, E and F variants. Its head officer was Comandante (Major) Ángel Salas Larrazábal (credited with 17 enemy aircraft shot down during Spanish Civil War). The unit consisted of a total of 113 men, 17 of whom were pilots and the rest officers, non-commissioned officers, corporals, specialist soldiers, and privates; all of them volunteers to participate in the war against the Soviet Union on the Eastern Front. Many of the pilots had extensive flight and air combat experience, having participated in the Spanish Civil War.

The First Blue Squadron departed towards the Eastern Front in late September flying 12 Bf 109 E and remained deployed until February 1942. The unit supported ground troops during the advance towards Moscow, attached to the JG 27 as 15 (span.) Staffel, always as support of the Panzergruppe III's and Panzergruppe IV's spearhead units. The unit returned to Spain on 1 March.

The field airfields where the First Blue Squadron was stationed were (period / place):

- 27.7.41 - 27.9.41 Werneuchen
- 27.9.41 - 1.10.41 Minsk
- 1.10.41 - 7.10.41 Moschna
- 7.10.41 - 12.10.41 Bjeloj
- 12.10.41 - 16.10.41 Szytschewka (Konaja)
- 16.10.41 - 29.10.41 Kalinin
- 29.10.41 - 6.11.41 Staritza
- 6.11.41 - 28.11.41 Ruza
- 28.11.41 - 10.12.41 Klin
- 10.12.41 - 15.12.41 Ruza
- 15.12.41 - 6.1.42 Dugino
- 6.1.42 - 17.2.42 Witebsk
- 17.2.42 - 25.2.42 Werneuchen

The First Blue Squadron was credited with 10 enemy aircraft shot down (plus other 3 not confirmed), setting several on fire on the ground during ground attacks to enemy airfields, and destroying several troop and materiel transport vehicles, in addition to destroying a rail convoy. The Spanish unit lost five pilots (two KIA: Comandante (Major) Muñoz and Teniente (Oberleutnant) Alcocer, and three MIA: Capitán (Hauptmann) Arístides, Teniente (Oberleutnant) Ruibal and (Oberleutnant) Teniente Bartolomé) as well as a single specialist soldier (Sabino Barriola).

== Sources ==
- Bowen, Wayne H. Spain during World War II, University of Missouri Publishing, (2006). ISBN 0826216587
- Caballero Jurado, Carlos; Guillén González, Santiago. Escuadrillas azules en Rusia, Almena, (1999). ISBN 9788492264483
- Fernández-Coppel, Jorge. La Escuadrilla Azul: los pilotos españoles en la Luftwaffe, La esfera de los libros, (2007) ISBN 9788497345149
- Herrera Alonso, Emilio. Cien aviadores de España, Centro de Publicaciones del Ministerio de Defensa, (2001) ISBN 9788478237913
- Neulen, Hans Werner. "In the Skies of Europe: Air Forces Allied to the Luftwaffe 1939–1945", Crowood Press, UK (2000). ISBN 1861263260.
- Ortega del Pozo, Daniel. "Cielo rojo, águilas azules", Editorial Actas, (2020) ISBN 9788497392013
- Turón, Victor (February–March 2000). "Die blaue Staffel: Les Espagnols sur le front Est". Aéro Journal (in French). No. 11. pp. 42–49. ISSN 0336-1055.
