= José Solano y Bote =

Spanish Navy officer and colonial administrator (1726–1806)

The Most Excellent The Marquess of Socorro OSJ
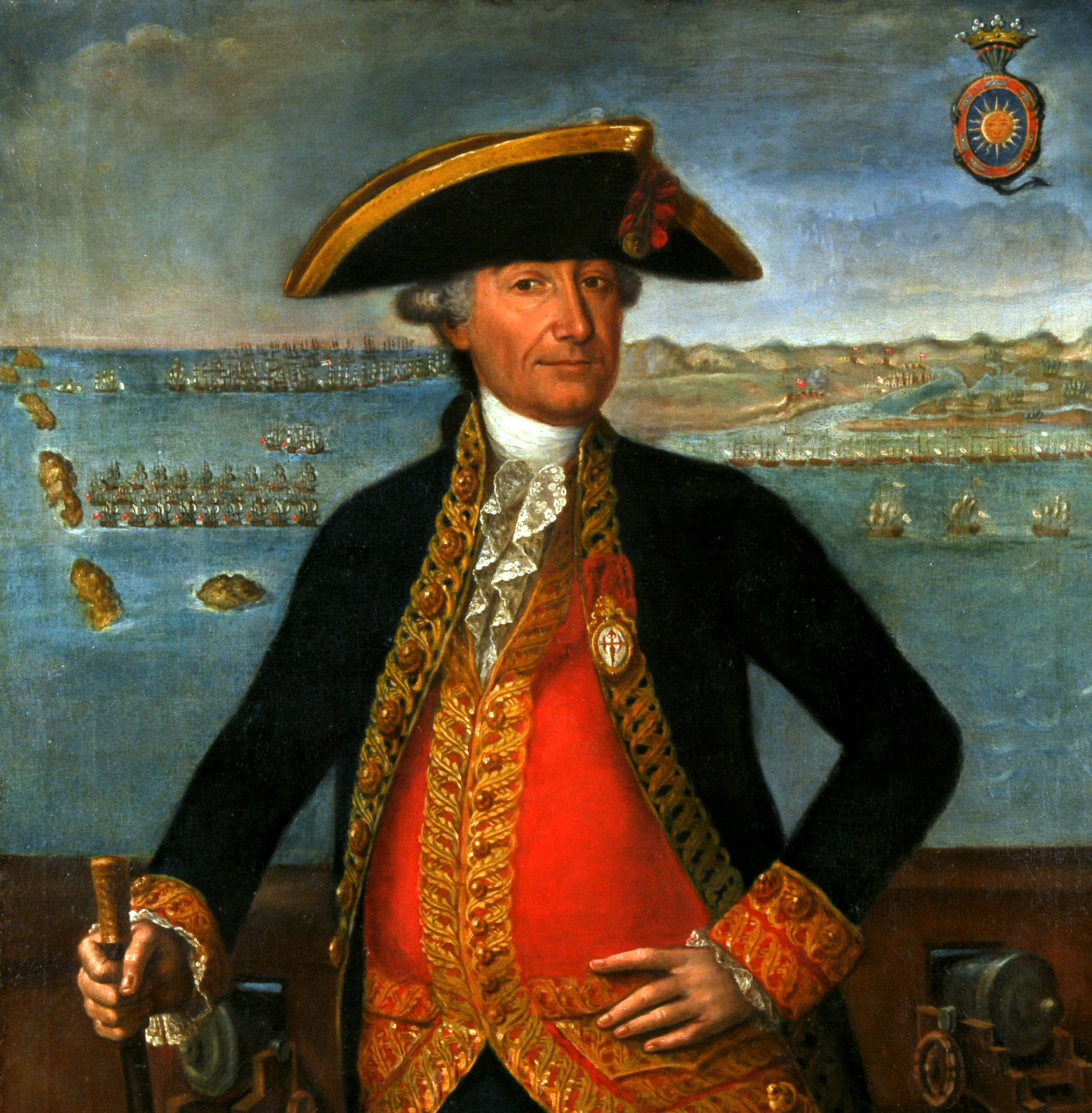
- José Solano y Bote in front of Santa Rosa Bay coming to the rescue of General Gálvez
- Born: March 6, 1726; Zorita, Extremadura
- Died: March 24, 1806 (aged 80); Madrid, Spain
- Military career
- Allegiance: Spain
- Branch: Spanish Navy
- Service years: 1742–1806
- Rank: Captain general of the Navy
- Conflicts: Battle of Toulon (1744); Siege of Pensacola
- Awards: Named Marquess de Socorro

Governor of Venezuela Province
- In office 12 November 1763 – 4 April 1771
- Monarch: Charles III
- First Secretary of State: Jerónimo Grimaldi
- Secretary of State for Indies: Julián de Arriaga y Ribera
- Viceroy of New Granada: Pedro Messía de la Cerda
- Preceded by: Felipe de Estenoz
- Succeeded by: Felipe de Font de Viela y Ondiano, marqués de la Torre

Governor and Captain General of Santo Domingo
- In office 17 April 1771 – 3 August 1778
- Monarch: Charles III
- First Secretary of State: Jerónimo Grimaldi; Count of Floridablanca
- Secretary of State for Indies: Julián de Arriaga y Ribera; Marquess of Sonora
- Viceroy of New Spain: Antonio María de Bucareli
- Preceded by: Manuel de Azlor y Urries
- Succeeded by: Isidoro de Peralta y Rojas

Captain general of the Navy José de Solano y Bote, 1st Marquess of Socorro (March 6, 1726 – March 24, 1806) was a Spanish Navy officer and colonial administrator.

== Biography ==
He served an extensive career in the Spanish Navy starting at the age of 16 until his death in 1806. Shortly after joining the Navy in 1742, he participated in the Battle of Toulon against the British Royal Navy. As a result of his performance in that battle he was promoted to the rank of alférez de fragata. In 1754 he was promoted to the rank of capitán de fragata and sent to the Americas as a commissary named by the King with the objective of helping with the demarcation of the limits between Spain and Portugal's holdings.

During this charge Solano spent seven years traveling the Orinoco River and its tributaries as well as making several trips to Bogota in pursuit of additional funding from the Viceroy to support his efforts. When he concluded his assignment he was promoted to the rank of Capitán de Navío in 1761. In 1762, after war broke out with Britain, he took command of Rayo, a ship of the line built in Havana. Solano was governor of Venezuela from 1763 to 1770 and later Governor and Captain General of Santo Domingo (1771–79).

== American Revolutionary War ==
He commanded a Spanish squadron during the American Revolutionary War. For his role in the Siege of Pensacola where he came to the aid of Governor Bernardo de Gálvez in March 1781, Solano was promoted to lieutenant general in 1782. He became the General Captain of the Armada in 1804.

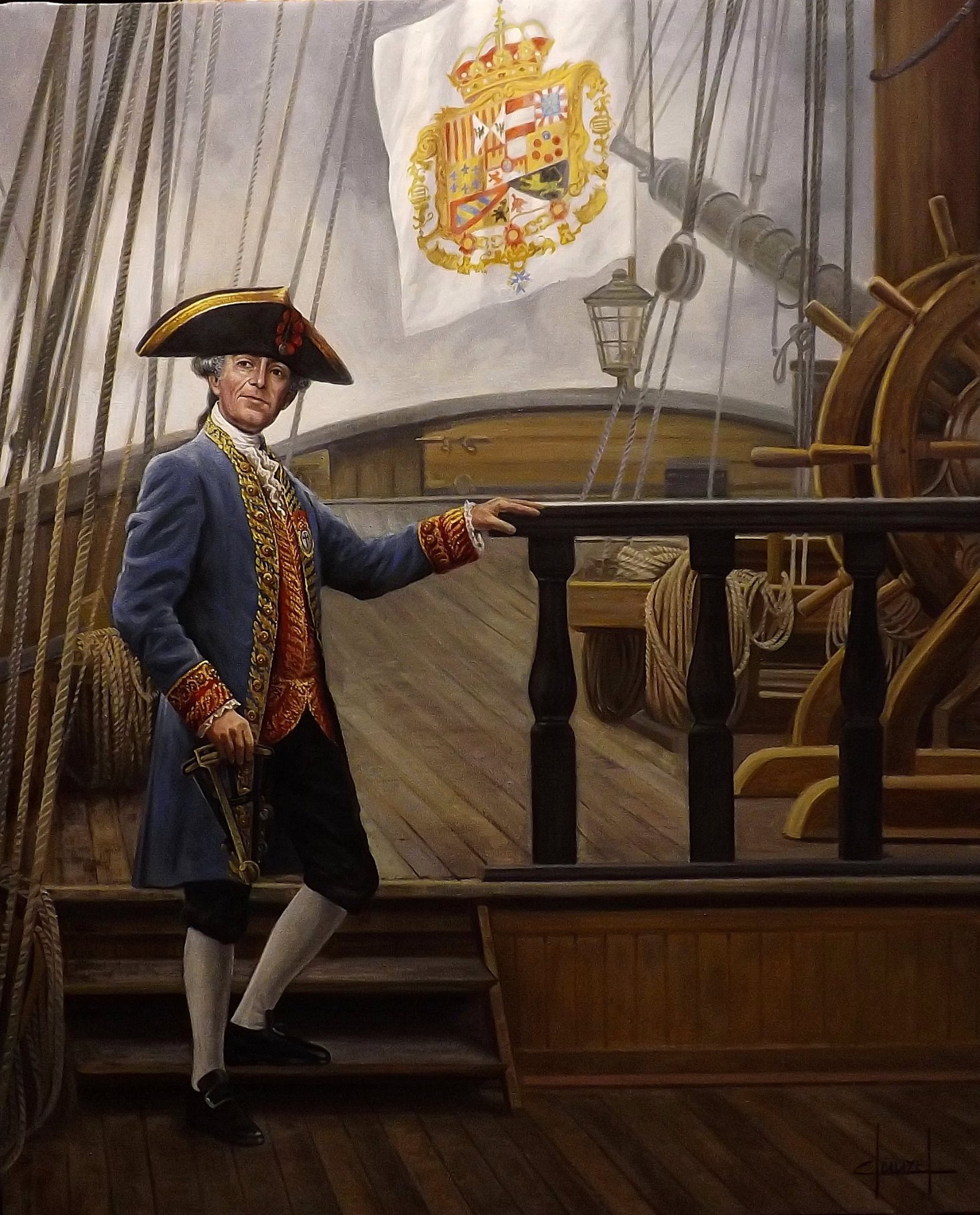
Posthumous portrait of Solano
