= List of World War II aces from Spain =

This is a list of fighter aces in World War II from Spain who fought with the Soviet Union and Nazi Germany. For other countries see List of World War II aces by country.

== A ==
- Vicente Aldecoa Lecanda (Germany)
- Dámaso Arango López (Germany)
- Luis Azqueta Brunet (Germany)

== B ==
- Vicente Beltrán (USSR)
- Fernando Bengoa Cremades (Germany)

== C ==
- Mariano Cuadra Medina (Germany)

== F ==
- Lorenzo Lucas Fernández Peña (Germany)

== G ==
- Antonio García Cano (USSR)
- José Ramón Gavilán Ponce de León (Germany)

== L ==
- Juan Lario Sánchez (USSR)
- José Luis Larrañaga (USSR)

== M ==
- Bernardo Meneses Orozco (Germany)
- Francisco Meroño Pellicer (USSR)

== R ==
- José Mateos Recio (Germany)

== S ==
- Ángel Salas Larrazábal (Germany)
- Fernando Sánchez Arjona Courtoy (Germany)
- Manuel Sánchez-Tabernero de Prada (Germany)
- José Pascual Santamaría (USSR)

== V ==
- Francisco Valiente Zárraga (Germany)

== Z ==
- Manuel Zarauza Claver (USSR)
