= Antonio José Amar y Borbón =

Spanish military officer and colonial official

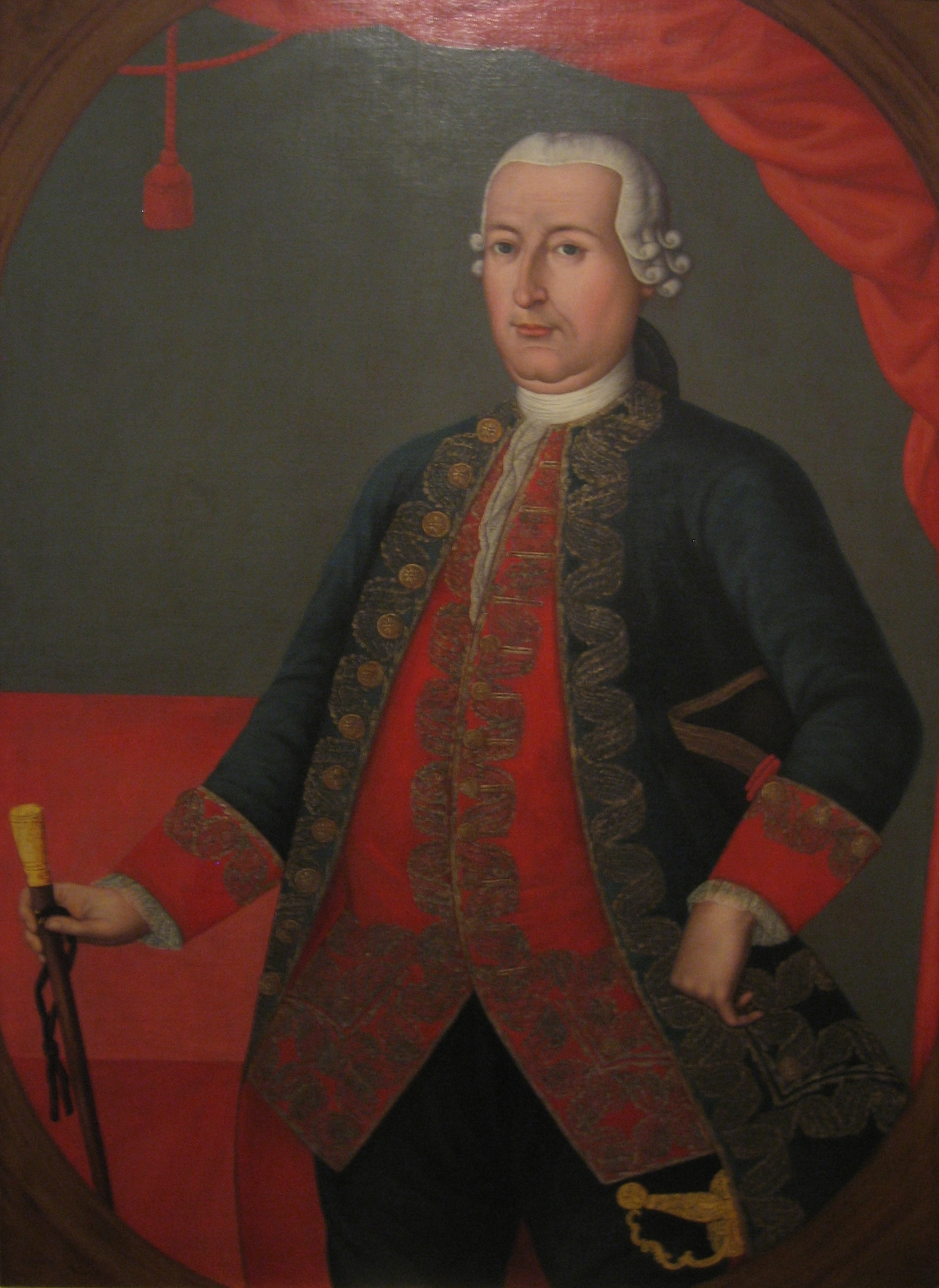
- Portrait of Amar y Borbón as viceroy of New Granada

14th Viceroy of New Granada
- In office September 6, 1803 – July 20, 1810
- Monarch: Charles IV of Spain
- Preceded by: Pedro Mendinueta y Múzquiz
- Succeeded by: Francisco Javier Venegas as titular viceroy

President of the Supreme Governing Junta of New Granada
- In office July 20, 1810 – July 25, 1810
- Monarch: Ferdinand VII of Spain de jure
- Preceded by: himself, as Viceroy of New Granada
- Succeeded by: José Miguel Pey

Personal details
- Born: Antonio José Amar y Borbón Arguedas; March 1742 Zaragoza, Kingdom of Spain
- Died: 1826 Zaragoza, Kingdom of Spain

Military service
- Allegiance: Kingdom of Spain
- Branch/service: Spanish Army
- Years of service: 1762–1803
- Rank: Lieutenant General
- Battles/wars: Seven Years' War; War of the Pyrenees

Antonio José Amar y Borbón Arguedas (1742 in Zaragoza, Spain – 1826? in Zaragoza) was a Spanish military officer and colonial official. From September 16, 1803 to July 20, 1810 he was viceroy of Viceroyalty of New Granada. During his mandate he faced the beginning of the independence movement. He is also remembered for introducing costumes and masked balls in the society of Bogotá.

== Background ==
Amar belonged to a distinguished medical family. His father, José Amar y Arguedas, was physician to King Ferdinand VI; his grandfather, Miguel Borbón y Berne, was physician to King Charles III; and his sister Josefa belonged to the Royal Medical Society of Barcelona.

At the age of 20 he entered the Farnesio Cavalry Regiment as a cadet. He rose in rank, and was promoted to brigadier after 31 years in the service. He participated in the siege of Gibraltar in 1779, and in the war against revolutionary France beginning in 1792. He earned distinction in the later conflict when he covered the retreat of Spanish troops to Tolosa, on the Guipúzcoa frontier, in 1794.

As a result of meritorious military service, he was made a knight of the Order of Santiago in 1770 and lieutenant general in the royal army in 1802. On July 26, 1802 he was appointed viceroy, governor and captain general of New Granada and president of the Royal Audiencia of Bogotá.

== Arrival ==
On September 16, 1803 he presented his credentials to his predecessor, Pedro Mendinueta, in Bogotá, and received a lavish welcome:

On 16 September at 5:30 in the afternoon Viceroy Don Antonio y Borbón and his wife Doña Francisca Villanova arrived; they were received by Don Miguel y Don Juan Gómez, mayors for this year, the first in Facatativa and the other in Fontibón, where a reception was given unlike any ever seen for a viceroy. The house was exquisitely decorated and supplied. More than 5,000 pesos was spent on only the food and refreshment. I was a witness, because I helped to serve at table. No greater obsequies of greatness and pomp will be done him than this. On the 22nd, at 7:30 in the morning, Viceroy Don Pedro Mendinueta left for Spain....

Bulls, illumination — lights of paper of silk with little tallow candles — fireworks and a masked ball in the coliseum.... Minuets, paspiés, bretañas, contradances, fandangos, torbellinos, mantas, puntos and jotas were danced.

He arrived in Bogotá after the epidemic of smallpox, bringing with him a vaccine for the disease. On December 19 he was given another public reception, in San Diego. On January 20, 1804 preparations began for a royal fiesta for the new viceroy, and the fiesta itself began on the 29th. On the 30th bulls were fought, and that night and the following night were illuminated. Masked balls were held on February 1 and 2, and the fiesta continued until the 6th. The masked balls, said to be especially enjoyed by the vicereine, were new to Bogotá society.

== Government ==
Amar's administration falls into two periods, divided by the 1808 invasion of Spain by Napoleonic France. During the first period (1803–08), his administration was fairly routine. During the second period, up to the Cry of Independence on July 20, 1810, he faced destabilization of the regime and the breaking up of Spanish colonial power.

He intended to continue the progressive policies of the viceroys of the second half of the eighteenth century (i.e., the Bourbon reforms), but he found the people influenced by the ideas of the French Enlightenment, and on the point of beginning the struggle for independence. He supported the botanical expedition of José Celestino Mutis and the scientific research of Francisco José de Caldas.

From 1805, Amar began to experience health problems and hearing loss.

There was strong support for King Ferdinand VII after he had been taken prisoner by the French, but the power vacuum in the colony caused by the crisis eroded the authority of the royal officials and strengthened the hand of the Criollos. Amar did not agree to the demands of the Crillos to form a military force to defend against a possible French attack, because he was not confident of their loyalty to the Crown. On their part, the Criollos worried of the possible adherence of the viceroy and the Audiencia to the French party. And the viceroy and Audiencia were also not on the best of terms.

At the beginning of September 1809, at the time of the revolution in Quito, Amar y Borbón summoned two public meetings of the oidores (members of the Audiencia), public prosecutors, civil and ecclesiastical employees and members of the capital elite to determine what actions should be taken against the rebels. These councils split between the Crillos and the Peninsulares, the former rejecting the proposal to send troops to suppress the rebels. The viceroy finally determined to send a peace commission to negotiate, and at the same time, troops to contain the rebellion in case the negotiations failed.

Amar had Antonio Nariño (forerunner of Colombian independence) imprisoned with shackles in Fort San José de Bocachica in Cartagena. Later he was transferred to the jurisdiction of the Inquisition. Balthasar Miraño was also arrested for subversive activities and sent to Cartagena. Camilo Torres protested against the reduction in the number of deputies from America in the Cortes called by the Supreme Junta of Seville.

== His overthrow ==
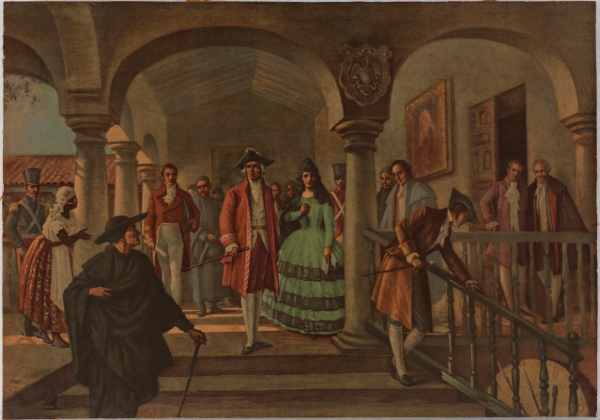
The prison of the viceroys by Coriolano Leudo Obando, depicts the arrest of the viceroy and his wife Francisca Villanova on July 25, 1810 after the events of the Revolt of July 20, 1810.

On July 20, 1810, a revolt began in Bogotá that demanded and obtain the convocation of an open town meeting. This meeting elected by popular acclamation a Supreme Junta of the Kingdom of New Granada, with Viceroy Amar as its president. However, his election as president received little support in the city, and there were rumors he planned a counterattack. On July 25, 1810 he was removed. José Miguel Pey, the new president of the Supreme Junta, ordered the arrest of the viceroy and his wife.

A few days later, on August 1, a communication was received from the Supreme Junta of Seville ordering him to turn over his office to a new viceroy, Francisco Javier Venegas. (Amar had been released in the meantime.)

Popular pressure forced his arrest again, on August 13. The junta in the capital did not approve his arrest. On the 15th they had him taken secretly from the capital to the convent of La Popa in Cartagena, where he was held a prisoner until his deportation to Havana, and thence to Spain, on October 12.

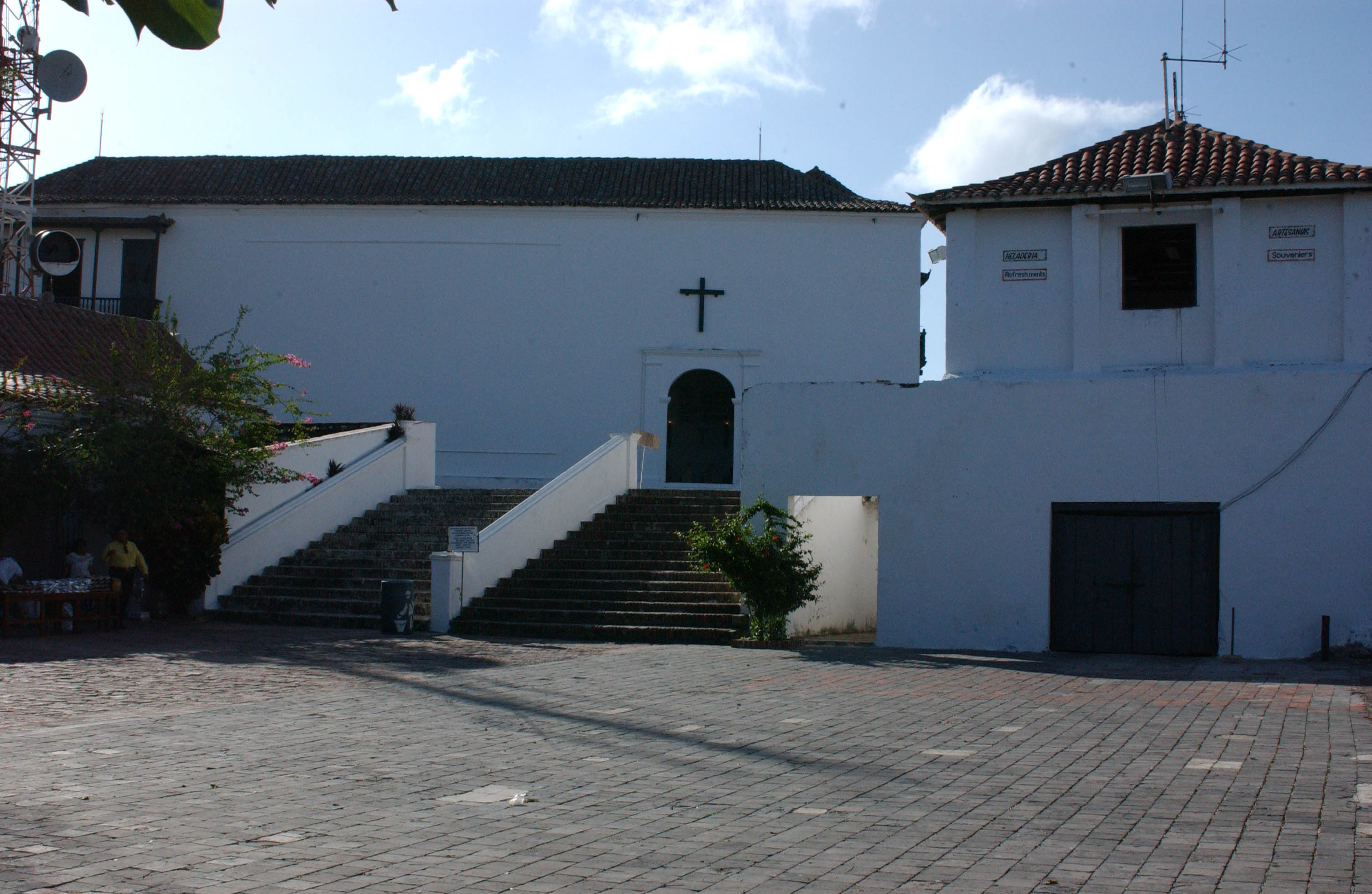
The convent of La Popa in Cartagena, where Antonio José Amar y Borbón was held prisoner

Because most of his possessions had been confiscated to satisfy charges against him, he arrived in Spain in dire economic circumstances. His attempts to secure a ministry in the royal government and to recover his possessions were unsuccessful. He was named an honorary councilor of state in 1820 and held other important positions. In 1824 he faced a long trial, in which he was acquitted. He died in 1826 in Zaragoza.

== Bibliography ==
- (in Spanish) Caballero, José María, Diario. Bogotá, Villegas Editores, 1990.
- (in Spanish) Herrán Baquero, Mario, El virrey don Antonio Amar y Borbón. La crisis del régimen colonial en la Nueva Granada. Bogotá, Banco de la República, 1988.
- (in Spanish) Ibañez, Pedro M., Crónicas de Bogotá. Bogotá, Academia de Historia y Tercer Mundo, 1989, vol. II
- (in Spanish) Restrepo Saenz, José María, Biografías de los mandatarios y ministros de la Real Audiencia (1671 a 1819). Bogotá, Editorial Cromos, 1952.

Government offices
Preceded by Pedro Mendinueta	Viceroy of New Granada; 1803–1810	Succeeded by Francisco Javier Venegas
