= José de Ezpeleta y Galdeano =

Spanish military officer and politician

Jose De Ezpeleta y Galdeano
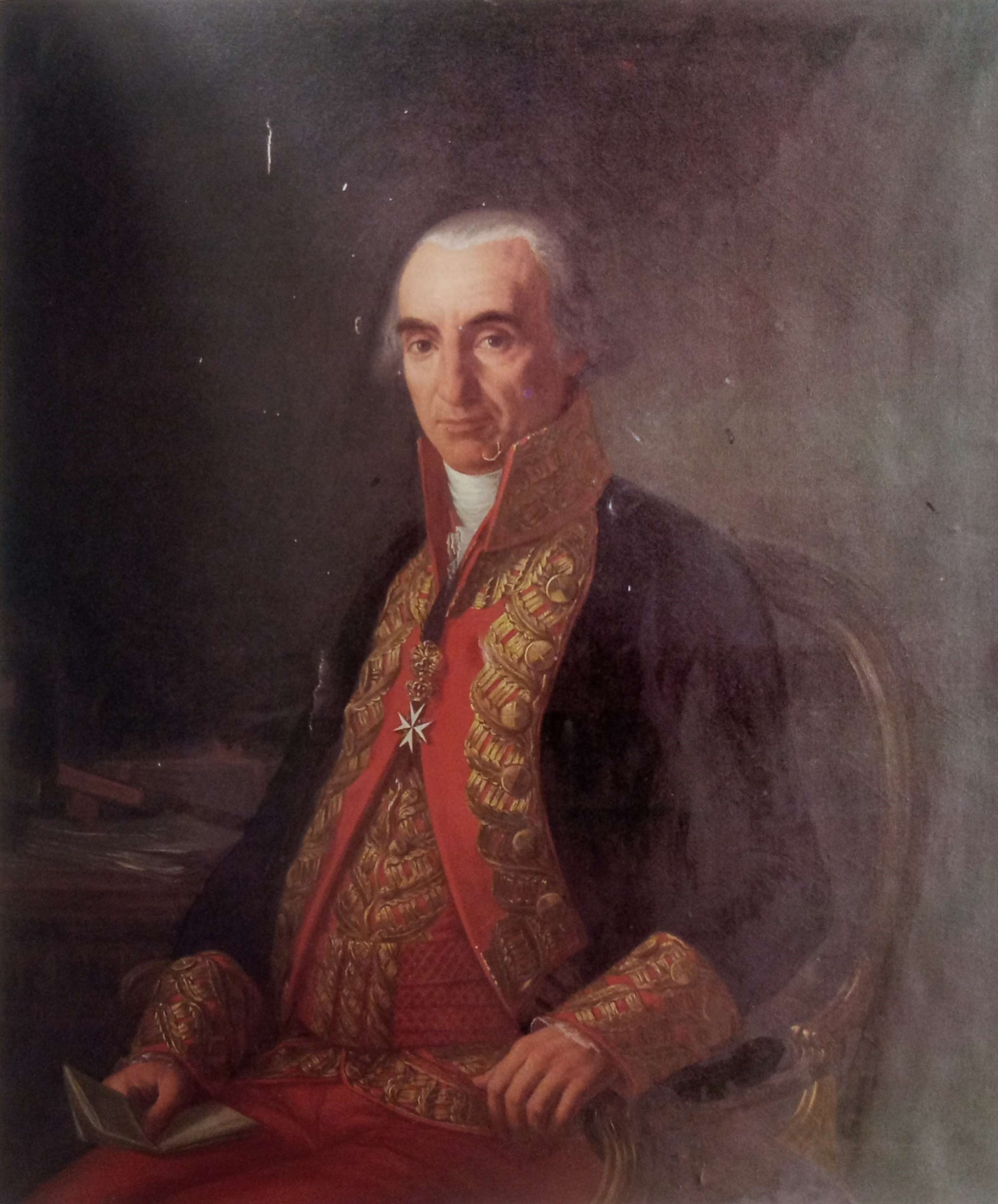
- Born: 1742 January 24; Barcelona
- Died: 1823 November 23

José Manuel de Ezpeleta y Galdeano, 1st Count of Ezpeleta de Beire (in full, José Manuel Ignacio Timoteo de Ezpeleta Galdeano Dicastillo y del Prado, conde de Ezpeleta de Beire) (24 January 1742 in Barcelona– 23 November 1823 in Pamplona) was a Spanish military officer and politician, governor of Cuba from 1785 to 1789, and viceroy of New Granada from 1789 to 1797.

A knight of the Order of Charles III and of the Royal and Military Order of San Hermenegildo, he was also a knight of the Sovereign Military Order of Malta. He was a governor of the Supreme Royal Council to His Majesty and a councilor of state, as well as field marshal in the Royal Army.

On 1 December 1785 he became Spanish governor of Cuba. He held this position until 1789 when he was promoted to viceroy of New Granada.

== As viceroy of New Granada ==
His term of office saw the birth of journalism in New Granada, under the direction of Manuel del Socorro Rodríguez, the first director of Papel Periódico in Bogotá. Two hundred sixty-five issues of this periodical appeared.

Ezpeleta founded the first theater in Bogotá. He supported literary circles, in which some of the future heroes of the independence movement participated. In 1794, Antonio Nariño published a translation of the Rights of Man, for which he was tried and convicted.

Like his predecessors, Ezpeleta tried to spur the mining industry in Mariquita, but he came to the conclusion that the operating expenses were greater than the output. He promoted Catholic missions as a means of pacifying the Indigenous who had not accepted Spanish rule, especially the Andaqui people.

== Back in Spain ==
In 1807 he was named Captain General of Catalonia, but by the time he reached Barcelona, the French troops under Guillaume Philibert Duhesme were already closing in on the city. Once the city had been taken, Ezpeleta refused to swear an oath of loyalty to José Bonaparte and was arrested and exiled to Montpellier where he remained until 1814.

After his return in Spain, he was made Viceroy of Navarre, where he had great difficulties in restoring the old institutions. He was faced by an unsuccessful revolt led by Francisco Espoz y Mina and another one in 1816 known as the Conspiración del Triángulo. But in 1820 the Spanish liberal revolution forced him to step down and he was replaced by Espoz y Mina. He went to live in Valladolid until 1823, when he was asked after the Absolutist Restoration to return to his function of Viceroy of Navarre. Ezpeleta returned to Pamplona in July, but aged 83, died a few months later.

Government offices
Preceded by Bernardo Troncoso Martínez del Rincón	Spanish Governor of Cuba; 1785-1789	Succeeded by Domingo Cabello y Robles
Preceded by Francisco Gil de Taboada y Lemos	Viceroy of New Granada; 1789-1797	Succeeded by Pedro Mendinueta y Múzquiz
Preceded by French occupation	Viceroy of Navarre; 1814-1820	Succeeded by Trieno liberal
