= Pedro Mendinueta y Múzquiz =

Spanish lieutenant general and colonial official

Pedro Mendinueta y Múzquiz (June 7, 1736 in Elizondo, Navarre – 1825) was a Spanish lieutenant general and colonial official. From January 2, 1797, to 1803 he was viceroy of New Granada. He was a knight of the Order of Santiago, and he was awarded the Gran Cruz of Carlos III.

== Background ==
Mendinueta began his military career as an infantry cadet in 1756. He arrived in America for the first time in 1763, charged with organizing the militias in Cuba and Puerto Rico. He returned to the New World in 1782; in 1783 he was part of the army in Havana. The following year he went to New Spain, where he organized the provincial and urban militias. He returned to Spain in 1789. He fought in the War of the Pyrenees against the French First Republic during the years 1793–1795. During the Battle of Boulou from 29 April to 1 May 1794, cavalry under his command clashed with French troops under Pierre Augereau.

== As viceroy of New Granada ==
On January 1, 1796, he was named viceroy of New Granada, in succession to José Manuel de Ezpeleta. He received the office from Ezpeleta on January 2, 1797, in Cartagena de Indias. He entered the capital of Santa Fe on March 18, 1797.

During his term of office, he provided water to the western part of Santa Fe, taking it from the Río del Arzobispo. He improved communications with Tunja, Vélez, Carare and other cities of the north by improving the road towards Venezuela.

He supported scientific investigations in the viceroyalty. In July 1801 he received, with great interest and esteem, the naturalists Baron Alexander von Humboldt, German, and Aimé Bonpland, French, who were traveling with the permission of the Spanish Crown to study the flora, fauna and geography of its American possessions. They also intended to produce a map of South America north of the Amazon River. A map of the viceroyalty was a preoccupation of Mendinueta, who believed that many of the works he wanted to undertake were not possible without a more accurate knowledge of the geography of the colony.

José Celestino Mutis solicited economic support from the viceroy for an astronomical observatory. The observatory was built under the supervision of architect Fray Domingo de Petrés between 1802 and August 1803. Mendinueta got the Spanish court to send instruments. He ordered the fourth census of the population.

He named Doctor Miguel de Isla to the chair of medicine. Isla taught anatomical theory and dissected corpses in the Hospital San Juan, incorporating this practice into the teaching of medicine. This had not been done before in the viceroyalty. Mendinueta also ordered José Celestino Mutis to reorganize the Faculty of Medicine. This plan was adopted by the colonial government in 1804.

Mendinueta wrote an extensive Memoria Sobre el Nuevo Reino de Granada (1803). He took issue with the negative portrayal of the colony given by one of his predecessor, Archbishop Antonio Caballero y Góngora. The work, divided into four parts (ecclesiastical affairs, administration, finances and the military), is an important account of the colony at the beginning of the nineteenth century, just before the war of independence. The work has not been published in English, and only recently in Spanish (ISBN 978-0-7734-6566-4, 2003).

He faced an insurrection of French Negroes in Cartagena, who attempted to kill the governor of the city, as well as an insurrection of the natives of Túquerres and Guaitarilla. The Indigenous rebelled because of pressure of taxes and tithes. The rebels assassinated the governor and the collector of tithes. Mendinueta also worked to bring unconquered Indigenous tribes under Spanish authority and reorganized the government of the Llanos.

He proposed the establishment of bishoprics of Santa Fe de Antioquia, Vélez, and the Llanos, although his proposals were lost in the bureaucracy. He reported that in the territories formerly administrated by the Jesuits, little progress had been made since the expulsion of that order in 1767. He maintained good relations with the Church, although not with the Audiencia.

He tried to increase the supply of medicines to the poor and reorganized the Hospital San Juan de Dios in Bogotá, providing for a monthly inspection to ensure that the poor were receiving adequate attention there. He took a similar interest in other hospitals in the colony. He founded the pesthouse in Bogotá. In 1801 he took largely successful sanitary measures to avoid a new epidemic of smallpox.

Mendinueta had a reputation as a hard worker and a man of advanced ideas. He had many plans to improve the colony, some of which he was not able to put into effect. Recent wars with Britain and France had wrecked the economy and stimulated smuggling, and the public treasury was not able to support some of his ideas. Like his predecessor Ezpeleta, he worked hard to combat smuggling, but with little effect.

He supported the foundation of the Sociedad Patriótica de Amigos del País (Patriotic Society of Friends of the Country). The newspaper El Correo Curioso began publishing during his term. Antonio Nariño, a forerunner of Colombian independence, returned surreptitiously to the colony. Mendinueta had him arrested, violating a promise of amnesty (July 19, 1797).

== Back in Spain ==
Upon completion of his term as viceroy, Mendinueta returned to Spain on September 22, 1803. In 1807 he was named chief inspector of military services, member of the Supreme Council of War and advisor of state. During the French invasion he was taken prisoner. In 1814 he was named head of the Supreme Council of War by King Ferdinand VII. Mendinueta retired in 1822 and died in 1825.

Government offices
Preceded by José Manuel de Ezpeleta	Viceroy of New Granada; 1797–1803	Succeeded by Antonio José Amar y Borbón
