= Blue Division Medal (Germany) =

Award given to Spaniards fighting for Nazi Germany

Blue Division Medal Erinnerungsmedaille für die spanischen Freiwilligen im Kampf gegen den Bolschewismus
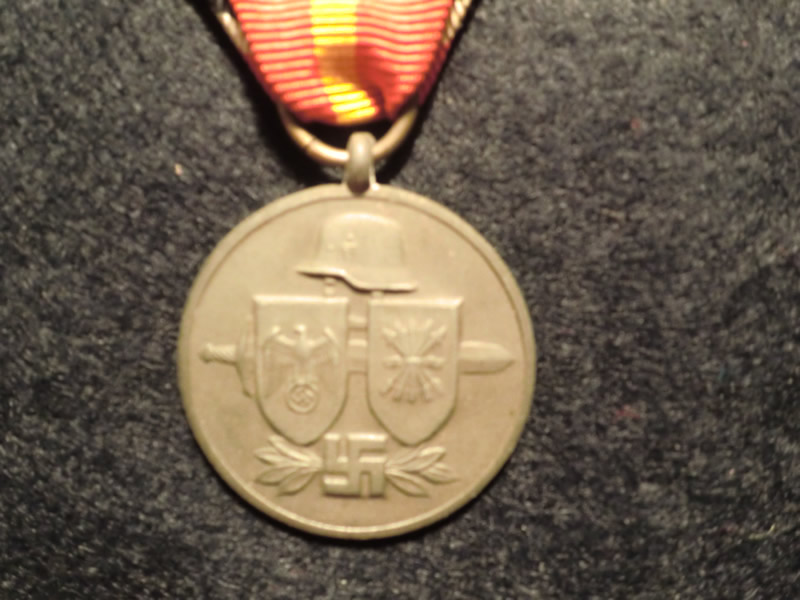
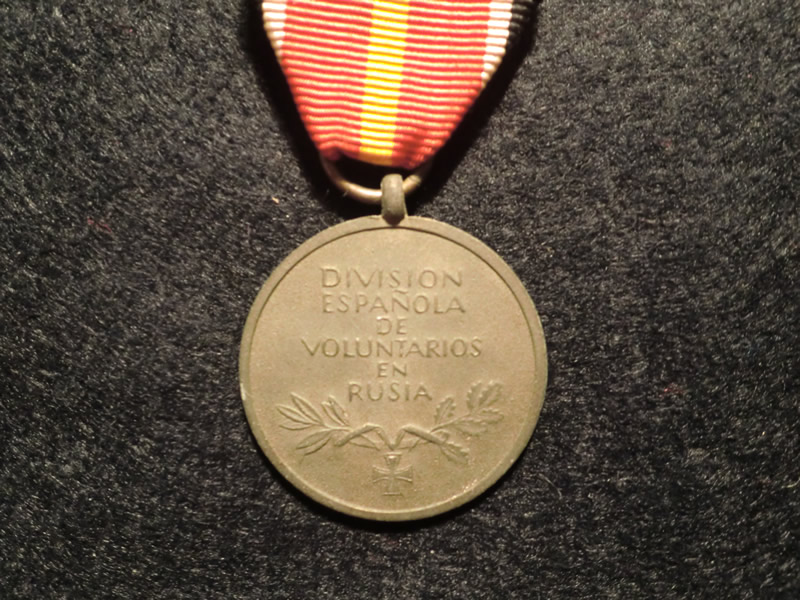
- Type: Campaign medal
- Awarded for: Volunteer Service in WW2
- Description: Zinc/Bronze 32mm diameter
- Presented by: Nazi Germany
- Eligibility: Spanish Forces
- Clasps: None
- Established: 3 January 1944
- Ribbon

The Spanish Volunteer Medal formally known as the Commemorative Medal for Spanish Volunteers in the Struggle Against Bolshevism (German: Erinnerungsmedaille für die spanischen Freiwilligen im Kampf gegen den Bolschewismus), commissioned 3 January 1944, was awarded by the Third Reich to recognize the men of the Blue Division who served at the Russian front during World War II. This force, attached to the Heer of the Wehrmacht, known as the 250th Infantry Division (span.), was in total composed of 47,000 men, sent by Francisco Franco to aid the Third Reich, as a way to pay back Adolf Hitler's help during the Spanish Civil War.

Members of the Blue Division also received the Medalla de la Campaña de Rusia from the Spanish government.

== Description ==
This medal was made by Deschler & Sohn in Munich, which marked the ring with the number "1" as their own medal maker mark. The ribbon is similar to the Iron Cross Second Class but with a yellow stripe in the middle to represent the Spanish flag. The obverse has a German Army helmet above two shields which show the Wehrmacht eagle and the Falange symbol, the two shields in front of a sword, with a swastika flanked by laurel leaves below. On the reverse is the inscription "División Española de Voluntarios en Rusia" and at the bottom the Iron Cross underneath laurel leaves.

== See also ==
- Battle of Krasny Bor
- Blue Division
- Medalla de la Campaña de Rusia
- Spanish Civil War
