= Posthumous promotion =

Advancement in rank after death

A posthumous promotion is an advancement in rank or position in the case of a person who is dead. Posthumous promotions are most often associated with the military, but may be granted in other fields such as business, public safety, science, or the arts. The higher rank is typically intended as a ceremonial recognition of one's achievements, bestowed after their death, though in the case of the military can occur erroneously if the recipient is reported missing before their death is confirmed.

== Academic promotions ==
The award of a posthumous degree relates to granting a university title after a student or faculty member has died. In many cases, honorary degrees may be bestowed upon the deceased.

== Military promotions ==
The granting of posthumous military decorations and promotions in rank is very common for soldiers and sailors who are killed in combat. The Purple Heart is one such award which is routinely presented to service members killed in action.

The presentation of posthumous rank in the United States Armed Forces has become less common in the 21st century, but was widely used during the era of the Vietnam War and prior. One of the most famous posthumous promotions was that of George Washington to the rank of General of the Armies of the United States. The promotion took place in 1976, 177 years after Washington's death.

Promotions can occasionally be unintentionally posthumous. For instance, the Arctic explorer Captain Sir John Franklin of the Royal Navy was promoted Rear-Admiral of the Blue (the lowest rank of admiral at that time) in October 1852. He had died over five years earlier on his final expedition, but his death was not confirmed until years after his promotion.

=== German military personnel in World War II ===
In Fall 1941, Adolf Hitler decreed, that German military personnel killed, died, or missing in World War II could be promoted in rank posthumously, if certain criteria had been met. This included:

1. Military personnel that would have been promoted in rank in the month following their death or disappearance according to Wehrmacht regulations;
2. Personnel that had been recommended for promotion in rank by the proper authorities before their death or disappearance;
3. As a recognition for meritorious service by the Commander in Chief of the branches of service, on their recommendation, or with their approval;
4. In those cases where the promotion was delayed for reasons not in the responsibility of the promotee.

In principle, personnel that committed suicide would not be considered for posthumous promotion, except in special cases with approval of the commander in chief of the Wehrmacht branch concerned. In general, the posthumous promotion would be active as of the first of the month of the death or disappearance, except in cases where the promotion would have been effective from an earlier date. This decree superseded an earlier decree from January 1941 and was retroactive from 26 August 1939, the day Nazi Germany mobilized its armed forces for the Invasion of Poland.

== Martial arts ==
Some martial artists will receive a posthumous belt rank promotion by their instructor. The belt is usually presented to a family member. A notable example of a posthumous promotion is American actor Paul Walker, who was a brown belt in Brazilian Jiu-jitsu at the time of his death, was promoted to a black belt after his death in 2013.

== Sinospheric monarchies ==
=== Promotion to monarchical status ===
In the Chinese cultural sphere, it was a common practice for dynasties to posthumously honor individuals who did not reign as a monarch during their lifetime with monarchical status and accord them with the appropriate titles. Such individuals usually, but not always, hailed from the same paternal lineage as the ruler who conferred them the status.

=== Promotion to official and noble ranks ===
Apart from the posthumous promotion to the status of monarch, it was also common for regimes in the Chinese cultural sphere to posthumously accord individuals with official positions and noble titles.

For example, the Southern Song general Yue Fei was posthumously accorded the official position of Junior Guardian (少保). In 1178 CE, the Emperor Xiaozong of Song bestowed Yue Fei the posthumous name Wumu (武穆). In 1204 CE, Yue Fei was posthumously given the noble title of Prince of E (鄂王) by the Emperor Lizong of Song. In 1225 CE, Yue Fei's posthumous name was changed to Zhongwu (忠武). In traditional Sinospheric fashion, the full posthumous noble title of Yue Fei is thus Prince Zhongwu of E (鄂忠武王).

In another example, Yelü Chucai who served in the Mongol Empire was posthumously granted the noble title of Prince of Guangning (廣寧王) and the posthumous name Wenzheng (文正) by the Emperor Wenzong of Yuan in 1330 CE. The full posthumous noble title of Yelü Chucai is therefore Prince Wenzheng of Guangning (廣寧文正王). Additionally, he was also posthumously conferred the official positions of Meritorious Minister Governing the Dynasty, Establisher of Government, Respectful and Trustworthy Facilitator of Fortune (經國議制寅亮佐運功臣); Grand Preceptor (太師); and Supreme Pillar of State (上柱國).

== Other promotions ==
Some business and political leaders have been granted top or honorary positions after dying. Such was the case of Kim Il Sung, promoted to a supreme grand marshal after his death in North Korea. His son Kim Jong Il was similarly promoted after his own death in 2011.

== See also ==
- Great Rites Controversy
