= Medalla de la Campaña de Rusia =

Medal of the Russian Campaign Medalla de la Campaña de Rusia
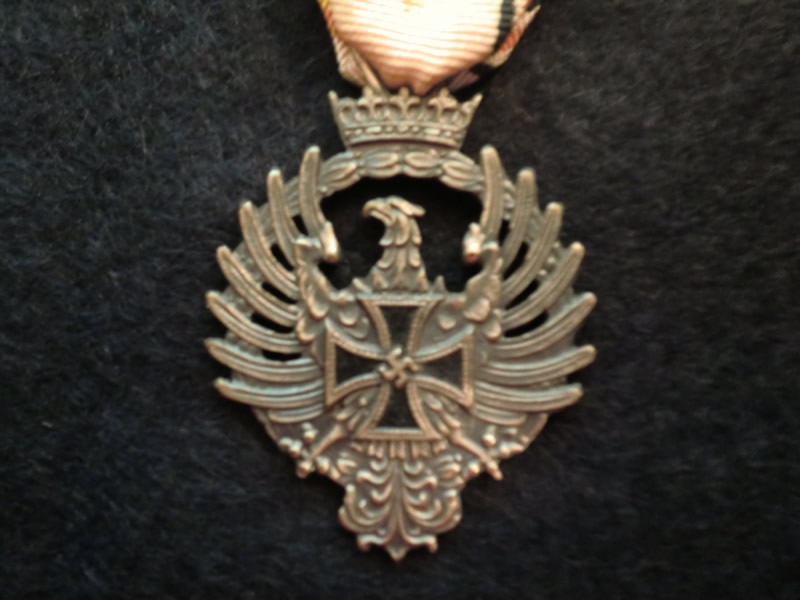
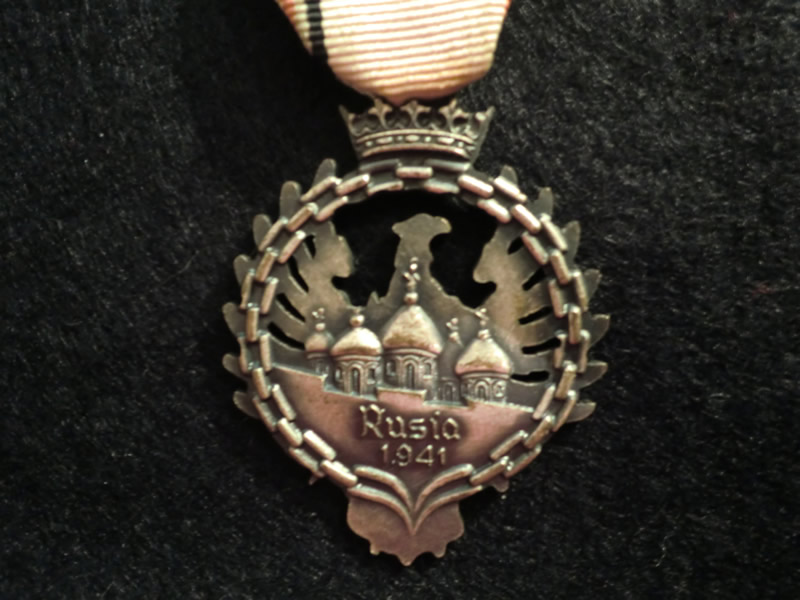
- The medal's obverse and reverse.

Awarded by the Spanish State
- Type: Campaign medal
- Established: 9 November 1943
- Country: Spain
- Eligibility: Members of the Blue Division
- Criteria: Service on the Eastern Front
- Status: Obsolete

Statistics
- First induction: 1943
- Last induction: 1944

Precedence
- Related: Blue Division Medal
- Ribbon bar

The Medalla de la Campaña de Rusia ("Medal of the Russian Campaign"), commissioned 9 November 1943, was awarded by Nationalist Spain to those Spanish volunteers who served at the Russian front during World War II, as members of the Blue Division. This force, attached to the Heer of the Wehrmacht, known as the 250th Infantry Division, was in total composed of 47,000 men, sent by Francisco Franco to aid the Third Reich, as a way to pay back Adolf Hitler's help during the Spanish Civil War.

== Description ==
- The obverse depicts the Eagle used by the Spanish Army, with a 1939 Iron Cross above the eagle, with the swastika, in place of the Cross of Saint James found on the emblem of the Army, all surrounded by a laurel circle and the nationalist open crown on the top
- The reverse features the Saint Sofia Cathedral surrounded by chains and bearing the inscription "Rusia 1941"
- The ribbon is white, with two stripes, the left depicts the Bicolor, whilst the right depicts the ribbon used by the 1939 Iron Cross 2nd class

== See also ==
- Blue Division Medal (Germany)
- Blue Division
- Spanish Civil War
