= Ad honorem =

Latin phrase

Ad honorem is a Latin phrase that literally can be translated as "to the honor". When used today, it generally means "for the honor of"; that is, not seeking any material reward. It is commonly used in universities for certain unpaid teaching positions.

When the phrase is used to mean professional work done voluntarily and without payment, it can be used interchangeably with pro bono ("for the public good").

It is also used as an alternative to honoris causa when awarding honorary degrees.

== See also ==
- Laurea ad honorem
- List of Latin phrases
