= Ratanabá =

Brazilian conspiracy theory

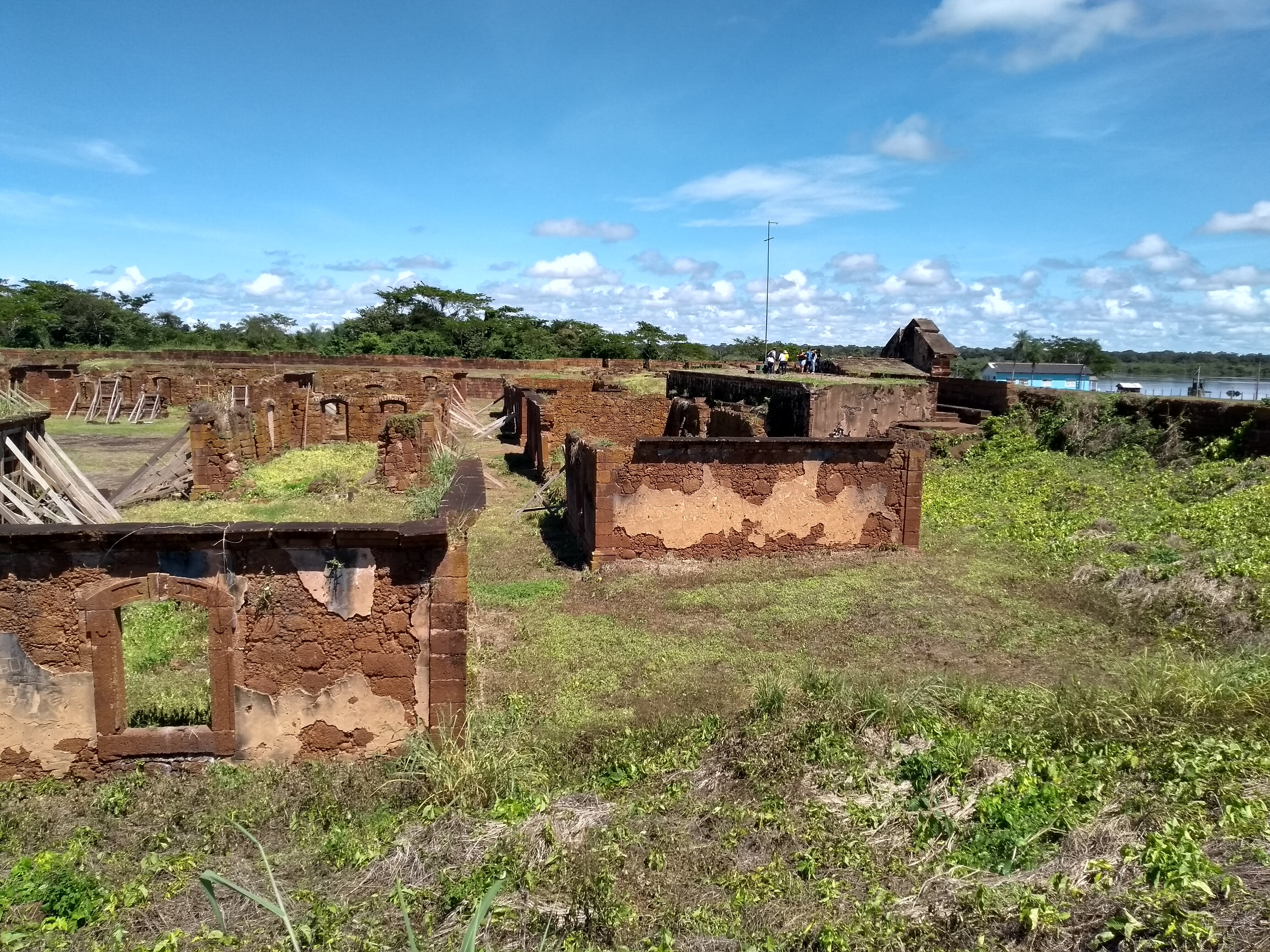
The conspiracy threatens the ruins of Forte Príncipe da Beira and was condemned by the National Institute of Historic and Artistic Heritage.

Ratanabá is a conspiracy theory about a lost city in the Brazilian Amazon rainforest allegedly built by extraterrestrial beings. The theory originated with Urandir Fernandes de Oliveira, who claims contact with extraterrestrials, and was spread by gossip pages like Choquei and former Brazilian Culture Secretary Mário Frias.

The story has been debunked as false but became a viral meme on Brazilian social media. Archeologists have dismissed the claims, with BBC Brasil reporting the legend "makes no sense" scientifically. The Intercept described it as "pure Bolsonarist lysergia" emerging shortly after the murders of Dom Phillips and Bruno Pereira.

== History ==
The conspiracy was initiated by businessman Urandir Fernandes de Oliveira, a self-proclaimed paranormal figure who promotes flat Earth and anti-vaccine conspiracy theories while claiming contact with extraterrestrial beings. These activities occur in areas under legal dispute. (Note: "Born in rural São Paulo, he claimed to communicate with [ET] Bilu since age 13, but only revealed this in 2009 - the same year part of Oliveira's farm was expropriated by presidential decree to become a quilombola territory. His company also circulated documents refuting flat Earth theories and anti-vaccine rhetoric.") Before Ratanabá, Urandir gained media attention in 2000 after creating the "Projeto Portal" in Corguinho, attracting followers by claiming extraterrestrial contact. He was arrested for fraud and ideological falsehood related to illegal land sales for a proposed alien reception city. In 2010, Urandir appeared on RecordTV's Domingo Espetacular claiming contact with "ET Bilu", which became an Internet meme. The alleged alien was also satirized on Band TV's comedy show Custe o Que Custar.

The Ratanabá city theory was also promoted by writer Isah Pavão, author of a self-published book on the subject and conspiracy videos on YouTube. Oliveira and Pavão claim the city dates back to the Ordovician period, among other pseudoscientific and implausible assertions.

On 10 June 2022, Choquei — a popular Twitter and Instagram page known for publishing unverified, distorted or false information — shared the Ratanabá theory with its followers. The topic quickly became a top Twitter trend and saw a spike in Google searches. Influencer Dani Russo also helped spread the rumor. Due to Choquei's millions of followers, many believed the unfounded Ratanabá theory. Geography professor Emanuel Daflon criticized the page for spreading misinformation:

The Ratanabá conspiracy theory is everywhere. A student just asked me if it was true. And the main spreader of this lie is CHOQUEI.

— Emanuel Daflon

That same day, Choquei issued a public retraction and deleted all posts about Ratanabá. However, the page continued to be mocked through memes on Twitter. The conspiracy continued spreading nonetheless. Actor and politician Mário Frias, then Culture Secretary of the Bolsonaro administration who had known Urandir since 2020, promoted the theory on 14 June 2022 — the same week the murder of Bruno Pereira and Dom Phillips dominated headlines. Frias faced criticism for amplifying both the conspiracy and moral panic about Brazilian sovereignty in the Amazon.

Due to threats to historical heritage caused by the spread of fake news and misinformation — particularly false connections made between the conspiracy and Forte Príncipe da Beira — Brazil's National Institute of Historic and Artistic Heritage declared these theories false and emphasized that archaeological information about the Fort is publicly available.

== See also ==
- Akakor
- City of the Caesars
- El Dorado
- Kuhikugu
- La Canela
- List of mythological places
- Lost city
- Lost City of Z
- Manuscript 512
- Paititi
- Quivira
- Seven Cities of Gold
- Sierra de la Plata
