= Akakor =

Mythical South American underground city

- Created by: Karl Brugger, Tatunca Nara

In-universe information
- Type: underground city
- Location: South America

Akakor is the name of a fictional mythic ancient underground city, located somewhere between Brazil, Bolivia, and Peru.

It was described by German journalist Karl Brugger, based on interviews with a self-proclaimed Brazilian Native chieftain Tatunca Nara in his book The Chronicle of Akakor (1976). Although Brugger was apparently convinced, the information in it has only one source (Tatunca Nara), who was later exposed by activist and adventurer Rüdiger Nehberg as being Günther Hauck, a German living in Brazil, who was born in Bavaria, Nazi Germany in 1941, and who had disappeared in the 1960s due to financial difficulties.

Elements of the story from The Chronicle of Akakor were used in the film Indiana Jones and the Kingdom of the Crystal Skull, where they were conflated with El Dorado, although references are to "Akator".

== See also ==
- City of the Caesars
- El Dorado
- Kuhikugu
- La Canela
- List of mythological places
- Lost city
- Lost City of Z
- Manuscript 512
- Paititi
- Quivira
- Ratanabá
- Seven Cities of Gold
- Sierra de la Plata
