= Manuscript 512 =

Colonial Brazilian document telling of the discovery of a lost city

- National Library of Brazil
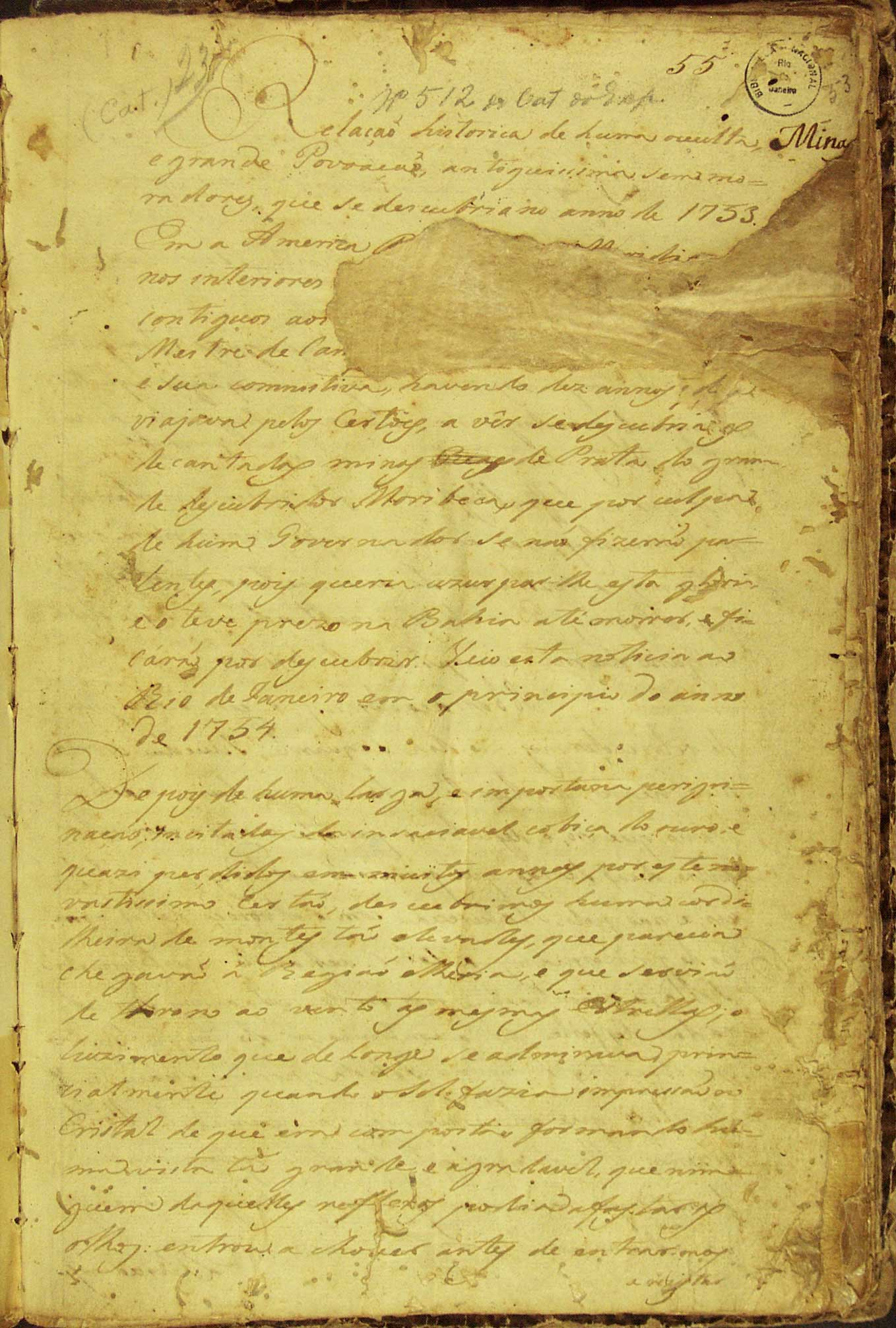
- First page of the manuscript
- Type: Manuscript
- Date: 1753
- Place of origin: Brazil
- Language: Portuguese
- Material: paper
- Script: Latin script
- Discovered: 1839

Manuscript 512 (Portuguese: Manuscrito 512) is a ten-page manuscript of dubious veracity and unknown authorship that relates to the discovery of a "lost city" in Bahia, Brazil by a group of bandeirantes in 1753. Originally found in 1839 at the National Library of Brazil, where it is kept to this day, the document tells of a group of Portuguese adventurers who searched for the legendary mines of Muribeca, traveling for about ten years in Brazil's jungle. During their journey, the adventurers discovered the abandoned settlement of a lost city whose architecture, monuments, and artifacts recall Greco-Roman style.

The manuscript is one of the most famed documents of the National Library's collection and some Brazilian historians consider it "the greatest myth of national archaeology", while others praise its vivid and picturesque writing style. During the 19th and 20th centuries, Manuscript 512 was the object of intense debate and instigated many expeditions by adventurers and investigators, notably Sir Richard F. Burton, who published the work Highlands of Brazil in 1869, and Colonel Percy Harrison Fawcett, who disappeared on one of his "Lost City of Z" expeditions through inner Brazil, resulting in several attempts to find him.

The "lost city" described in the manuscript inspired several articles, films and novels, such as José de Alencar's As Minas de Prata (1865), Rider Haggard's King Solomon's Mines (1886), and Arthur Conan Doyle's The Lost World (1912). In addition, the character Indiana Jones may have been inspired by the events surrounding Colonel Fawcett.

Access to the original document is very restricted, but a digitized version is currently available online.

== Discovery ==
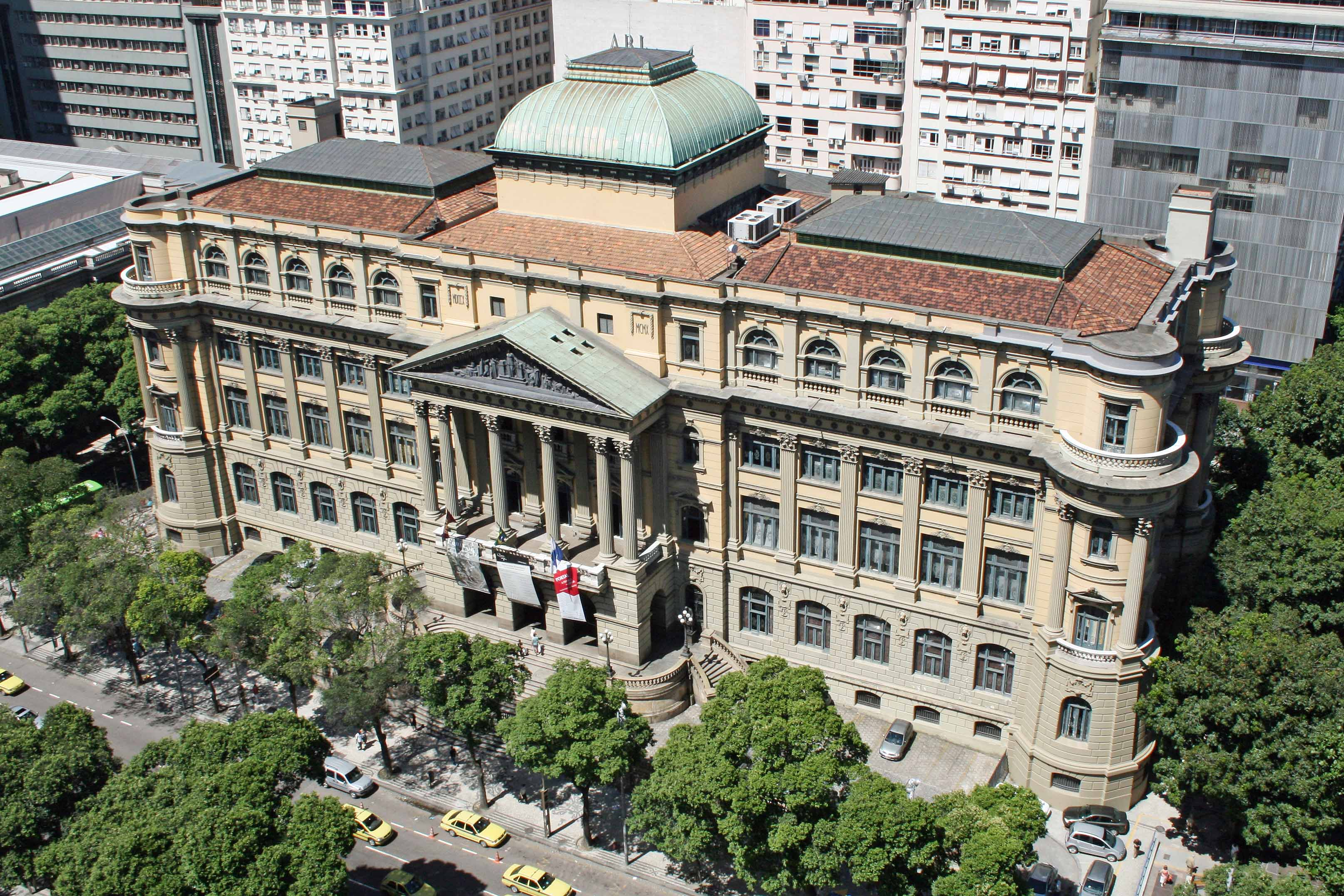
The National Library of Brazil

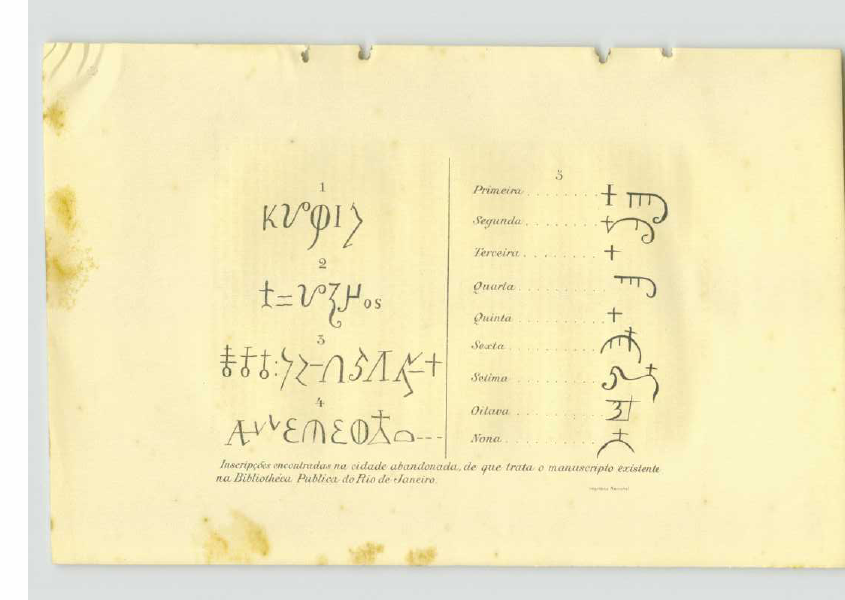
Manuscript inscriptions 512, as published by the IHGB. It translates: "Inscriptions found in the abandoned city, which are covered in the manuscript in the Bibliotheca Publica do Rio de Janeiro."

In 1839, naturalist Manuel Ferreira Lagos casually found the document, whose full title was Relação histórica de huma oculta, e grande Povoação, antiguissima sem moradores, que se descubrio no anno de 1753 ("Historical relation of an occult, large, very old settlement with no inhabitants that was found in the year 1753"), in the library's collection. He then presented it to the Brazilian Historic and Geographic Institute and canon Fr. Januário da Cunha Barbosa later publicized a full copy of the manuscript in the institute's magazine, Revista do Instituto Histórico e Geográfico Brasileiro, with a preface connecting it to the earlier case of Roberio Dias, also known as "Muribeca", a bandeirante arrested by the Portuguese crown for refusing to give information about mines of precious metals in Bahia, which later propelled numerous expeditions in the province. (The Bahia expansion was also motivated by the search for silver mines, although only saltpeter mines were found.)

Although the author of Manuscript 512 was (and still is) not identified, the members of the institute took the account as authentic in the hopes of finding the ruins of an advanced civilization in Brazil, a nation that had recently achieved its independence and sought to build a strong national identity. At the time, ruins of Pre-Columbian civilizations had been recently found in Latin America, such as Palenque in Mexico and fortifications in the Peruvian border, and that could signify that similar monuments were also hidden in Brazil. Accounts about rocks with purportedly Pre-Columbian inscriptions were common since colonial times; one of such examples was the Ingá Stone found in Paraíba in 1598, which contains what appears to be Latin letters. As such, Manuscript 512 strengthened the theory that an ancient Graeco-Roman civilization could have existed at some remote time in Brazil.

In 1840, Ignacio Accioli Silva and A. Moncorvo, two scholars from Salvador, Bahia, opined that the account about the lost city could be authentic because, according to explorers and some old inhabitants of the location, large ruins populated by runaway native and black slaves were commonly mentioned in tradition. Historian Pedro Calmon explained that rumors about ruins were already popular after the death of bandeirante João da Silva Guimarães in 1766 and, by the 1840s, were fully consolidated, in addition to being mixed with stories about indigenous refuges or quilombos in inner Bahia.

Between 1841 and 1846, searches for the lost city sponsored by the Brazilian Historic and Geographic Institute were conducted by Fr. Benigno José de Carvalho through Chapada Diamantina. Despite Carvalho's reported diligence, the expeditions were unsuccessful and the previous enthusiasm about the city's existence was replaced by disillusion and skepticism. A predominant theory at the time was that the vision of the lost city was inspired by the strange rocky formations of Chapada Diamantina; Teodoro Sampaio, who traveled through the region between 1879 and 1880, was convinced that the account of Manuscript 512 was fictional and described the mountain range poetically.

The number 512, by which the manuscript is currently known, first appeared in 1881 in the Exposition Catalogue of the History of Brazil by Ramiz Galvão.

== Content ==
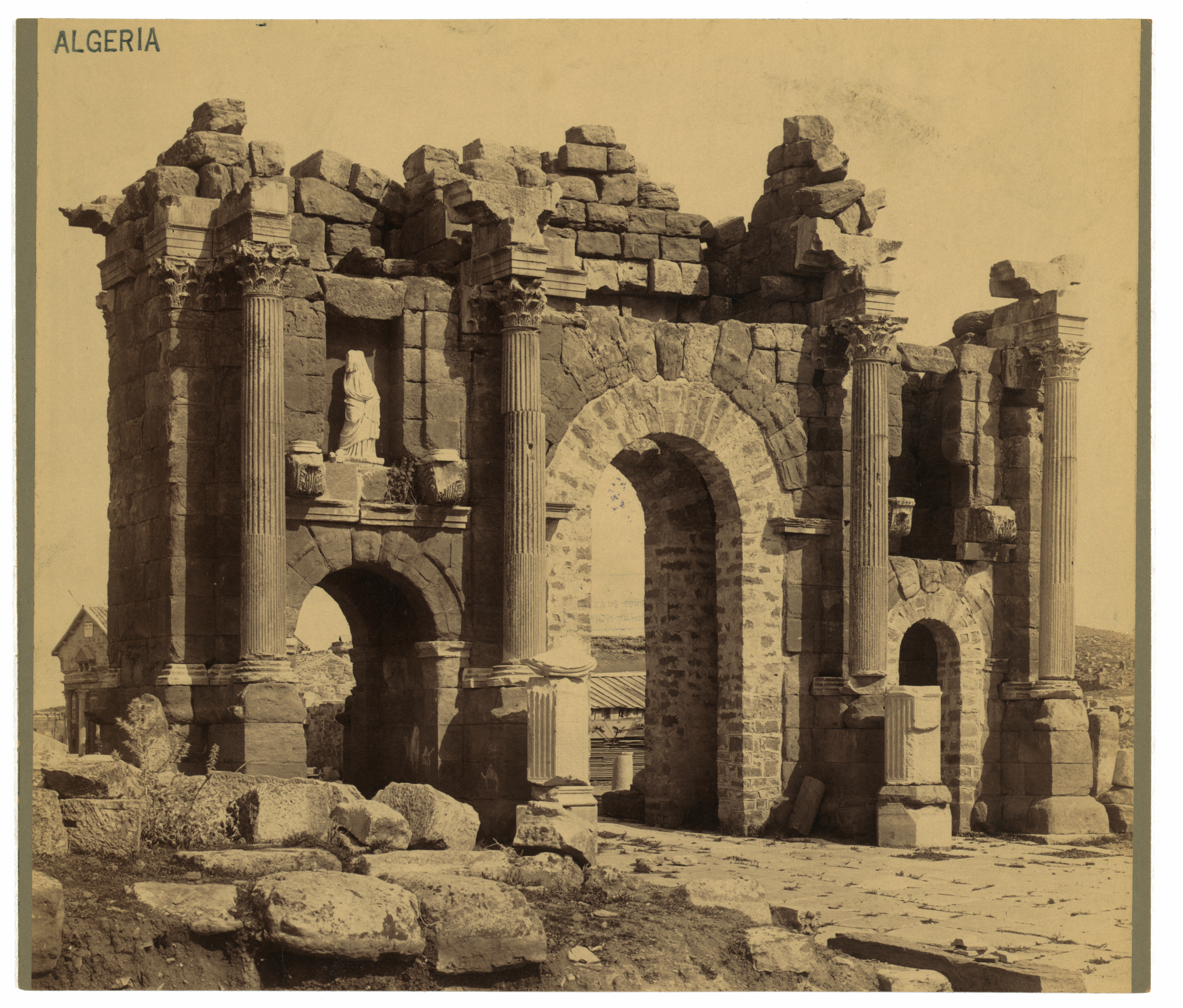
Triple Roman arch in Timgad, Algeria. The arch at the lost city's entrance described in the manuscript is similar in appearance to this one.

The manuscript itself appears to be a transcription of a lost original work. Although the main body of the document appears to be a personal letter, the preamble given by the transcriber describes it as a historical report. Because some parts of the manuscript's pages are decayed, a portion of the text is missing.

The text relates that a Portuguese colonel (whose name is missing) and his party were drawn by curiosity to the site of an impressively tall, glistening mountain range. By happenstance they found a path to summit the range with facility. When they reached the peak, they sighted a settlement that they initially mistook for one of Brazil's coastal cities. Upon approaching it, they found it was actually dilapidated and abandoned. The city's only entrance was ornamented with a triple archway, similar in appearance to Roman triumphal arches, on which there were inscriptions in an unknown language. The city's square had a black pedestal with a statue of a man pointing north and a large building near it was decorated with reliefs and inlaid works depicting crosses, crows (or possibly console-style swirls), and various other designs. The square also featured "Roman spires" (most likely obelisks) in all four corners. The main street's portico bore a relief carving of a half-naked figure wearing a laurel crown. There was a river next to the square and after following it the group reached a collection of mineshafts where they found silver-infused rocks and more undeciphered inscriptions. Somewhere outside of the city they also found a large countryside manor which contained fifteen separate houses surrounding a great central room (possibly an atrium). The party then tested the soil near the river for gold flecks, which they found in abundance. The author reflects on the curious state of the abandoned city and gives a brief mention of the fauna that inhabit the ruins, apparently describing maned wolves and kangaroo rats. It is anachronistically mentioned that João Antônio (the only member whose name was preserved) found a gold coin in one of the houses they searched, which depicted a boy kneeling down on one side and a bow, arrow, and crown on the other.

== Gallery ==
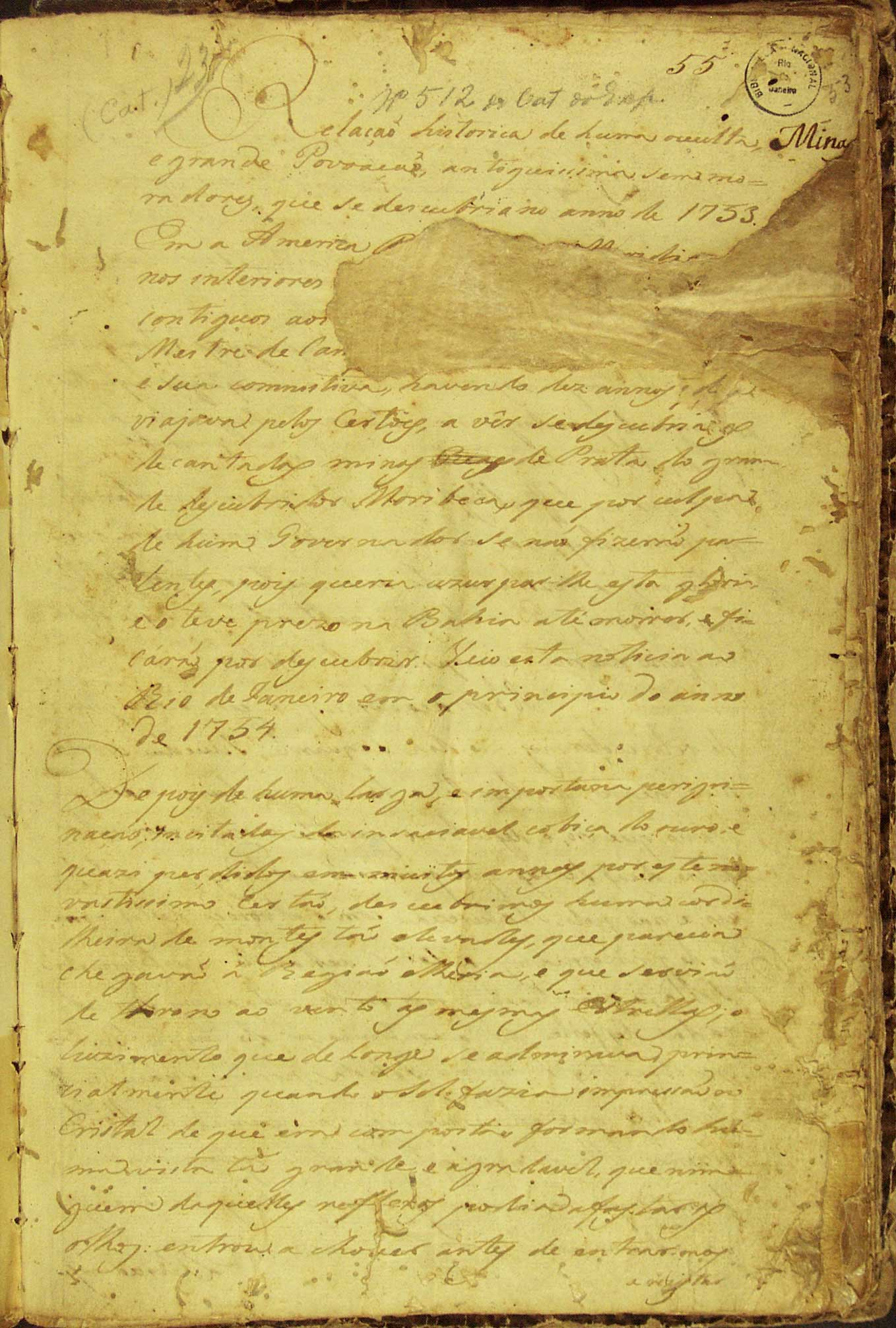
Page 1 of Manuscript 512

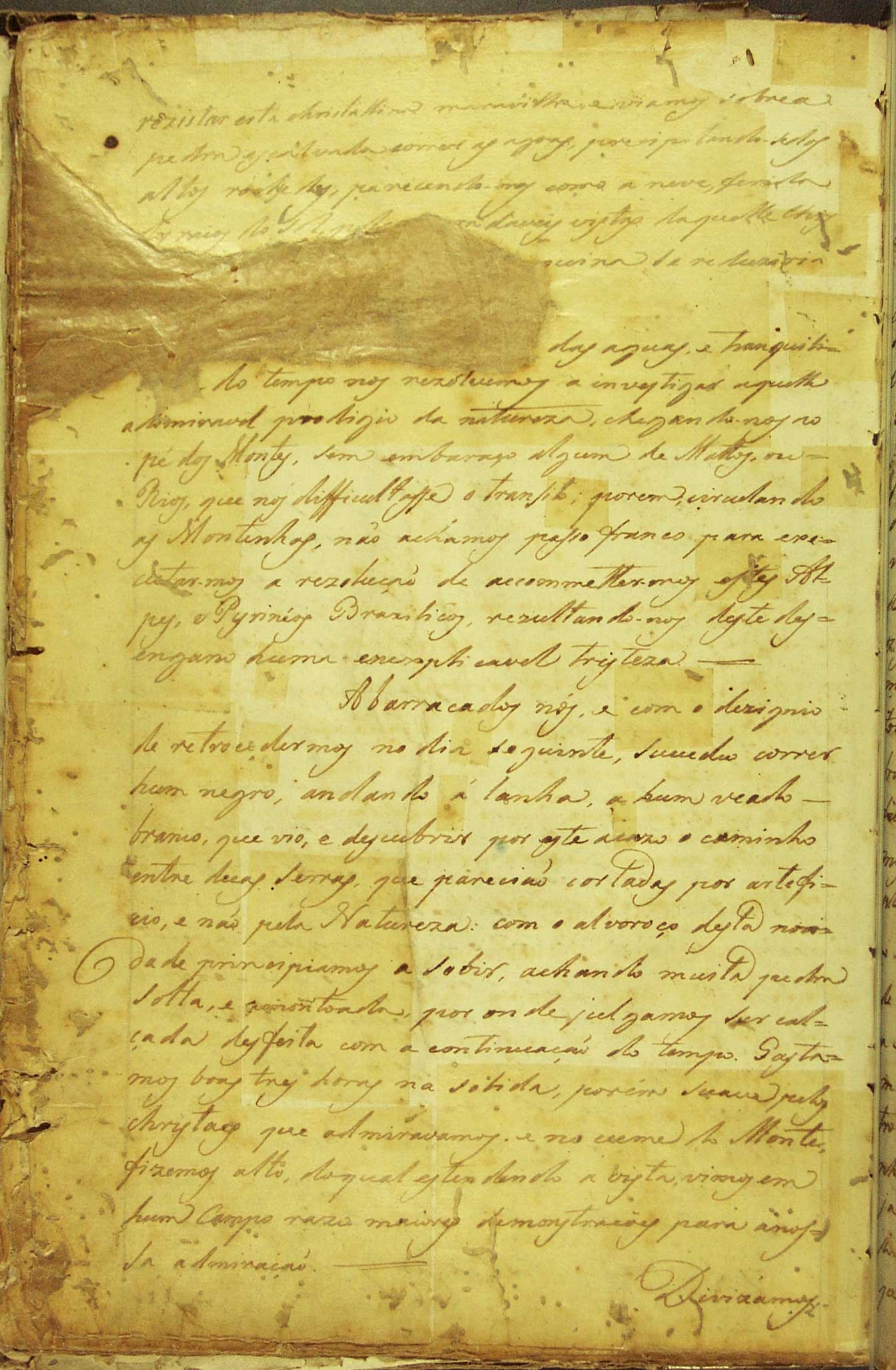
Page 2 of Manuscript 512

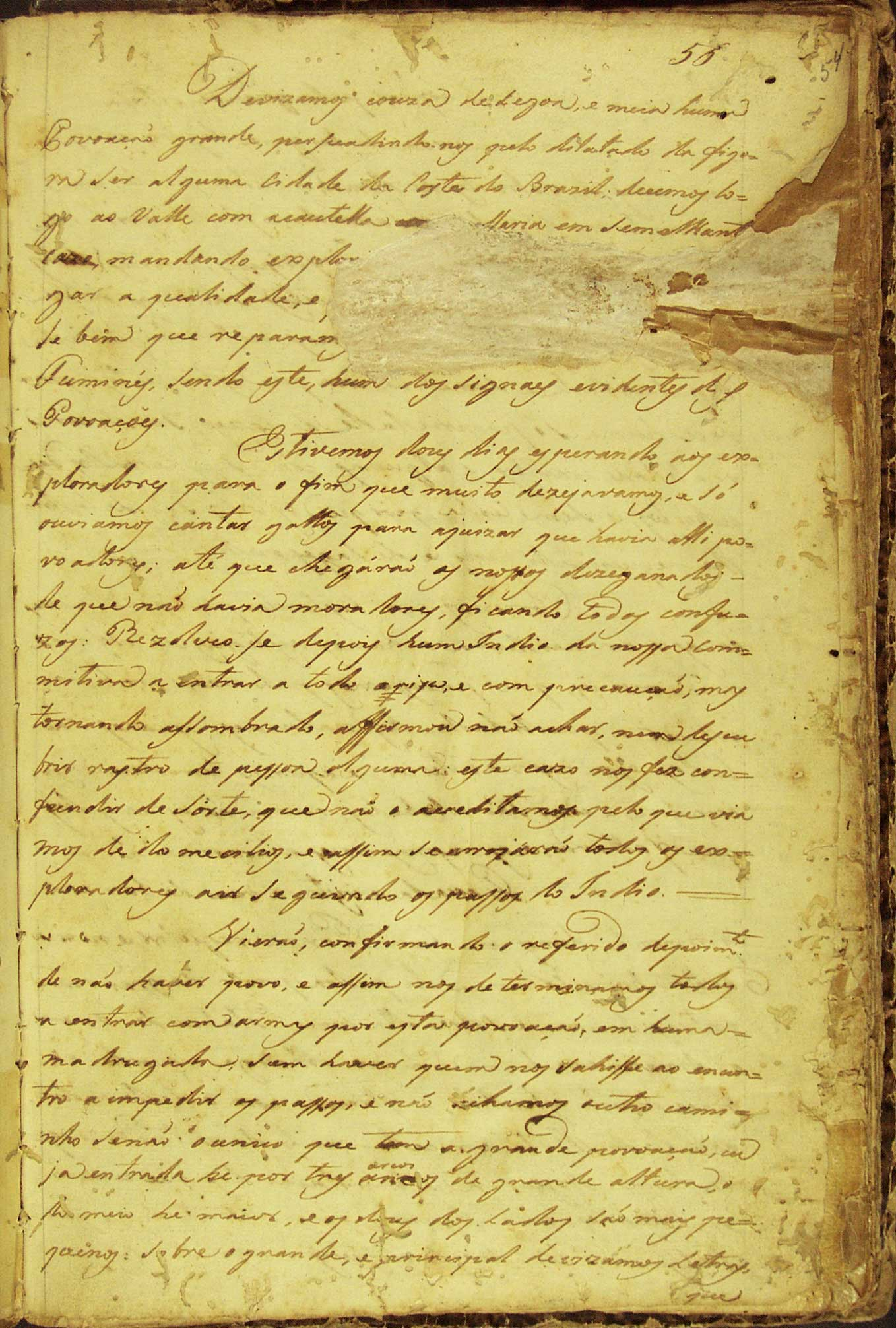
Page 3 of Manuscript 512

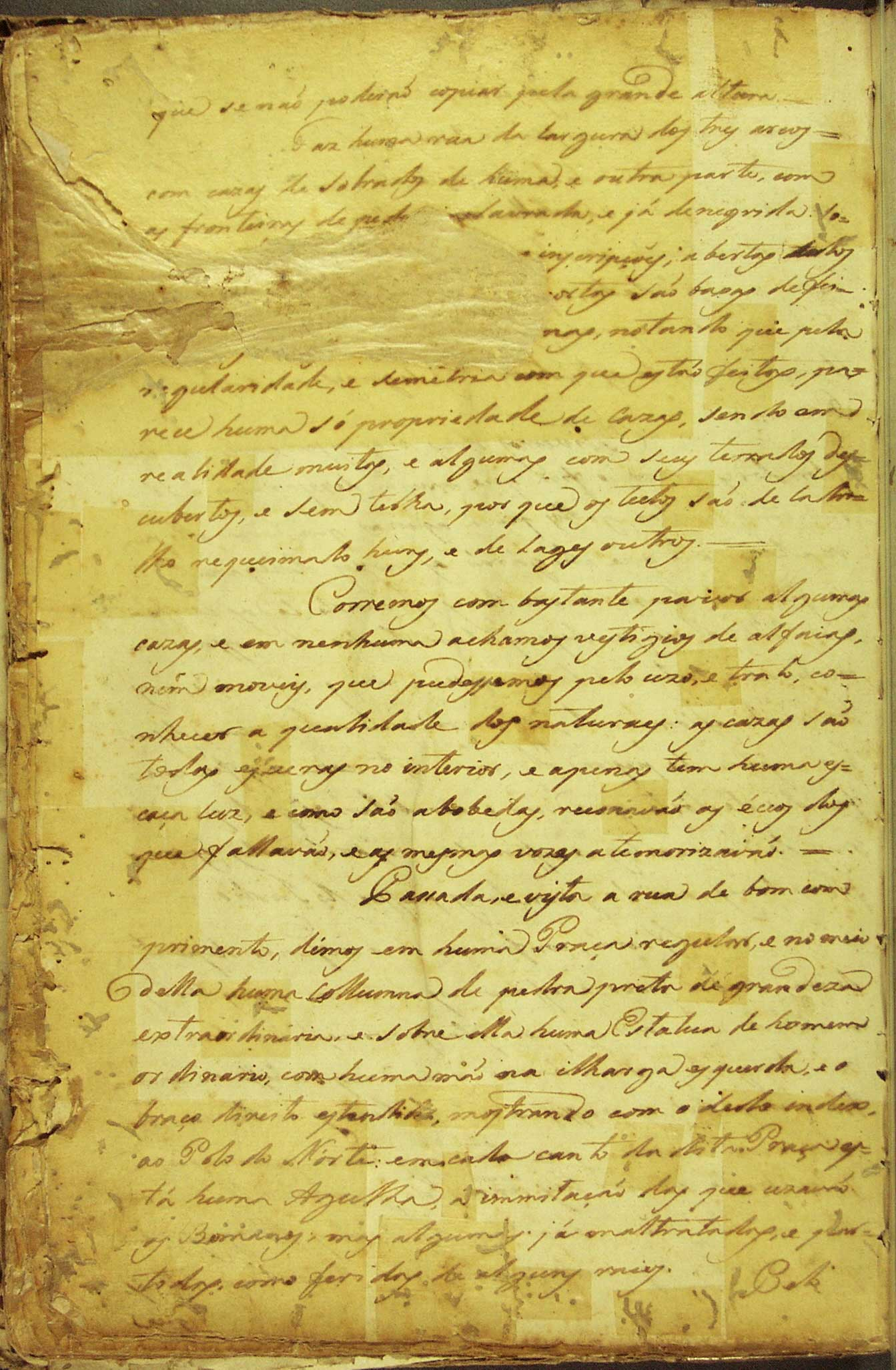
Page 4 of Manuscript 512

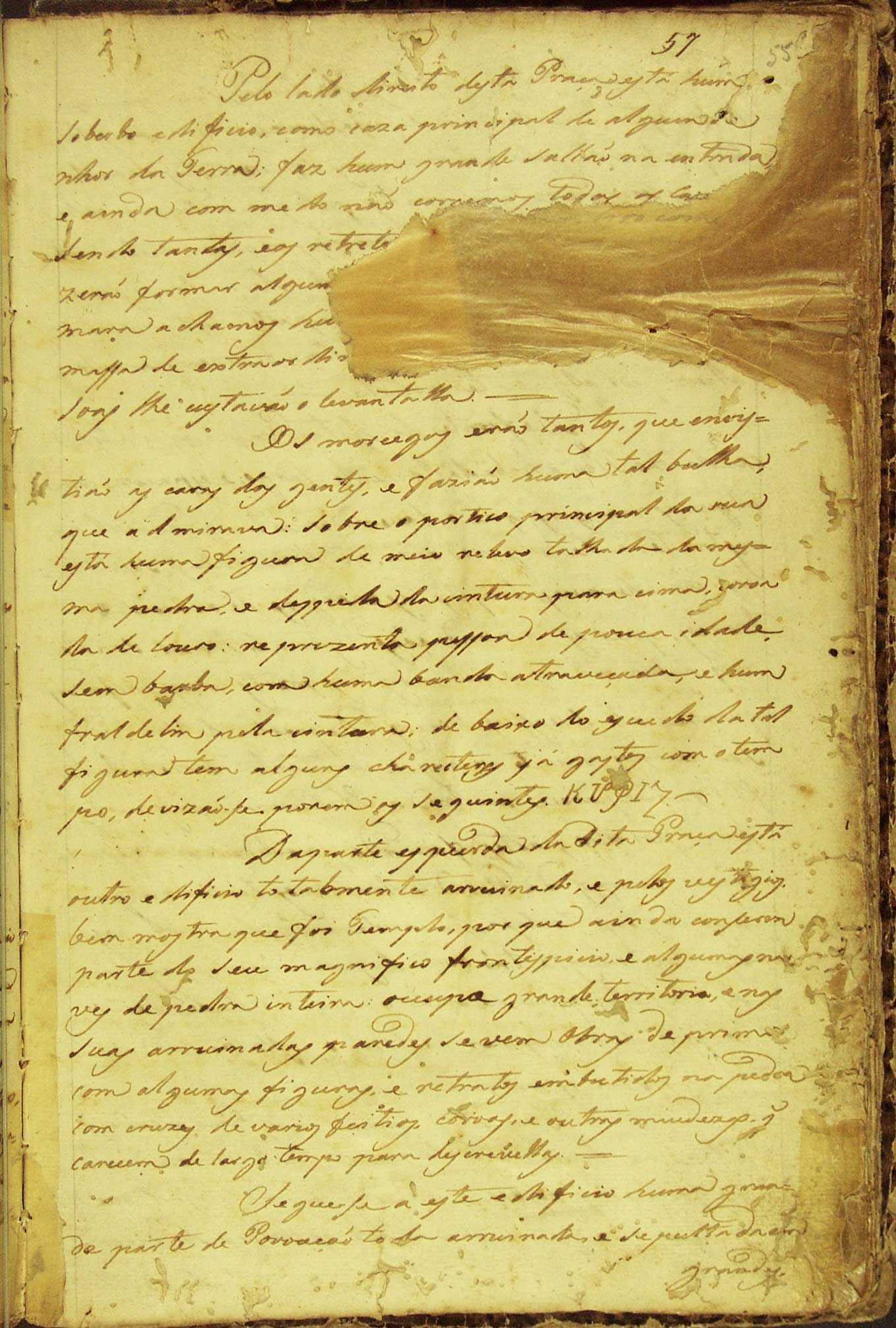
Page 5 of Manuscript 512

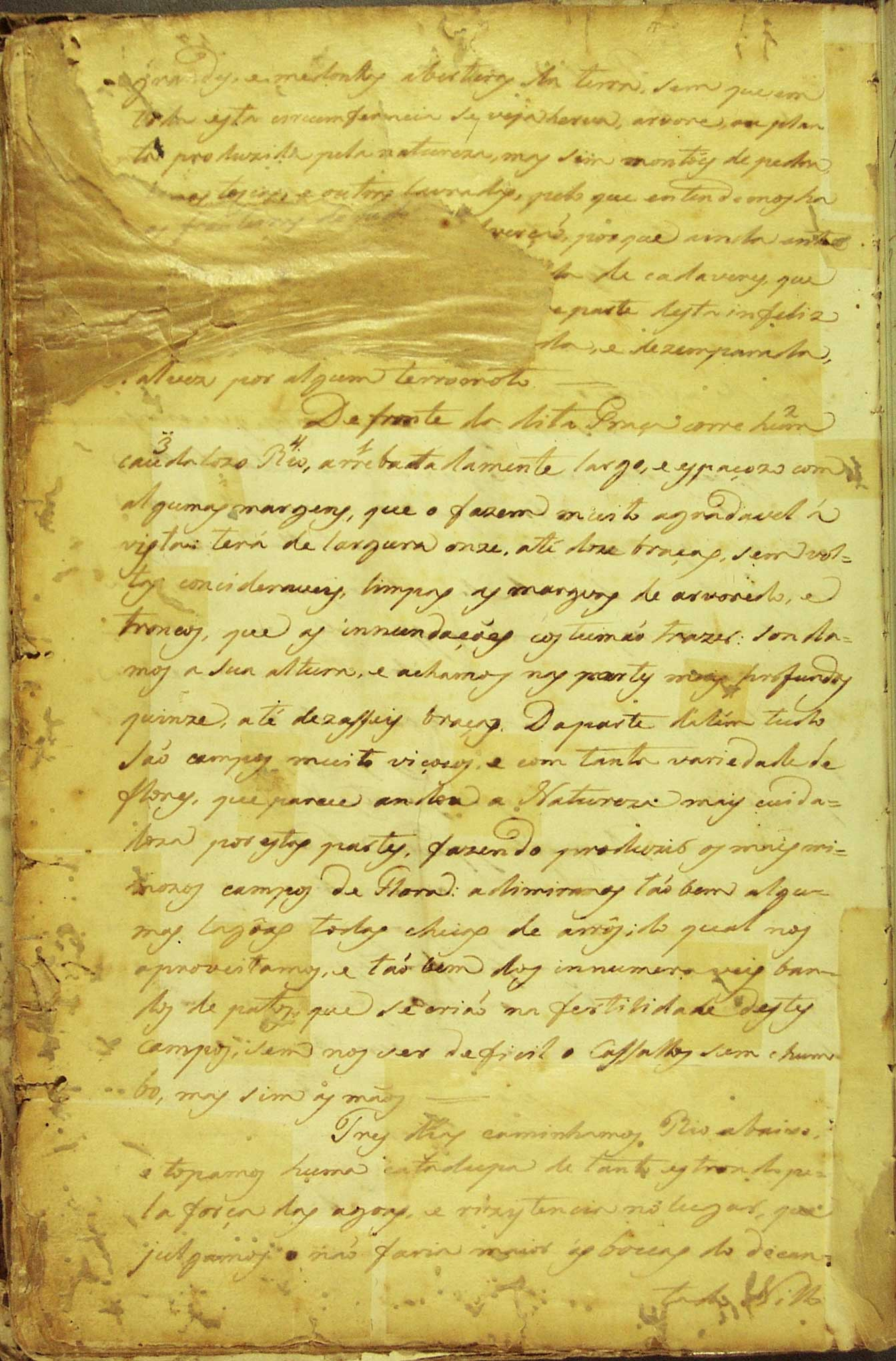
Page 6 of Manuscript 512

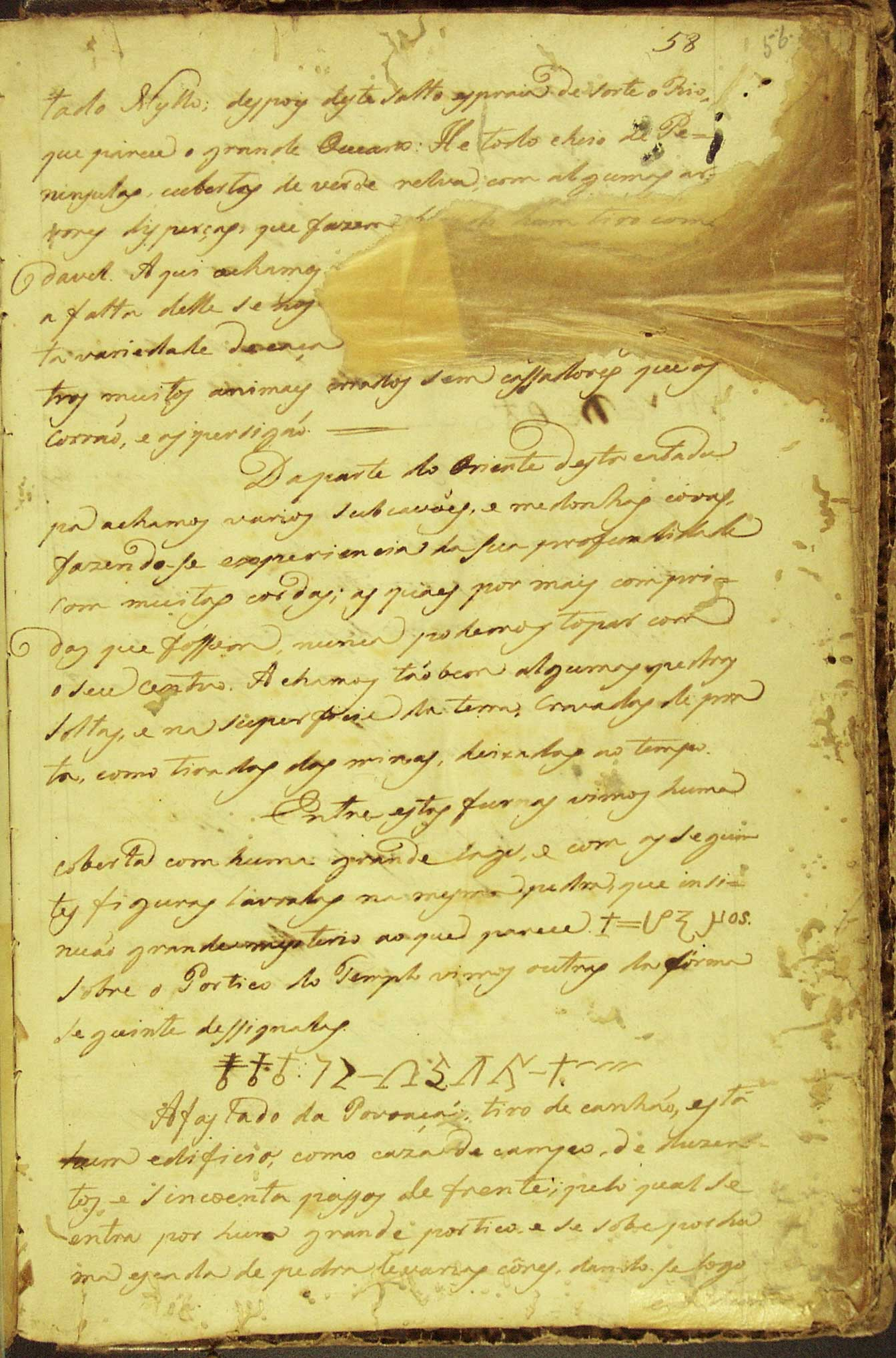
Page 7 of Manuscript 512

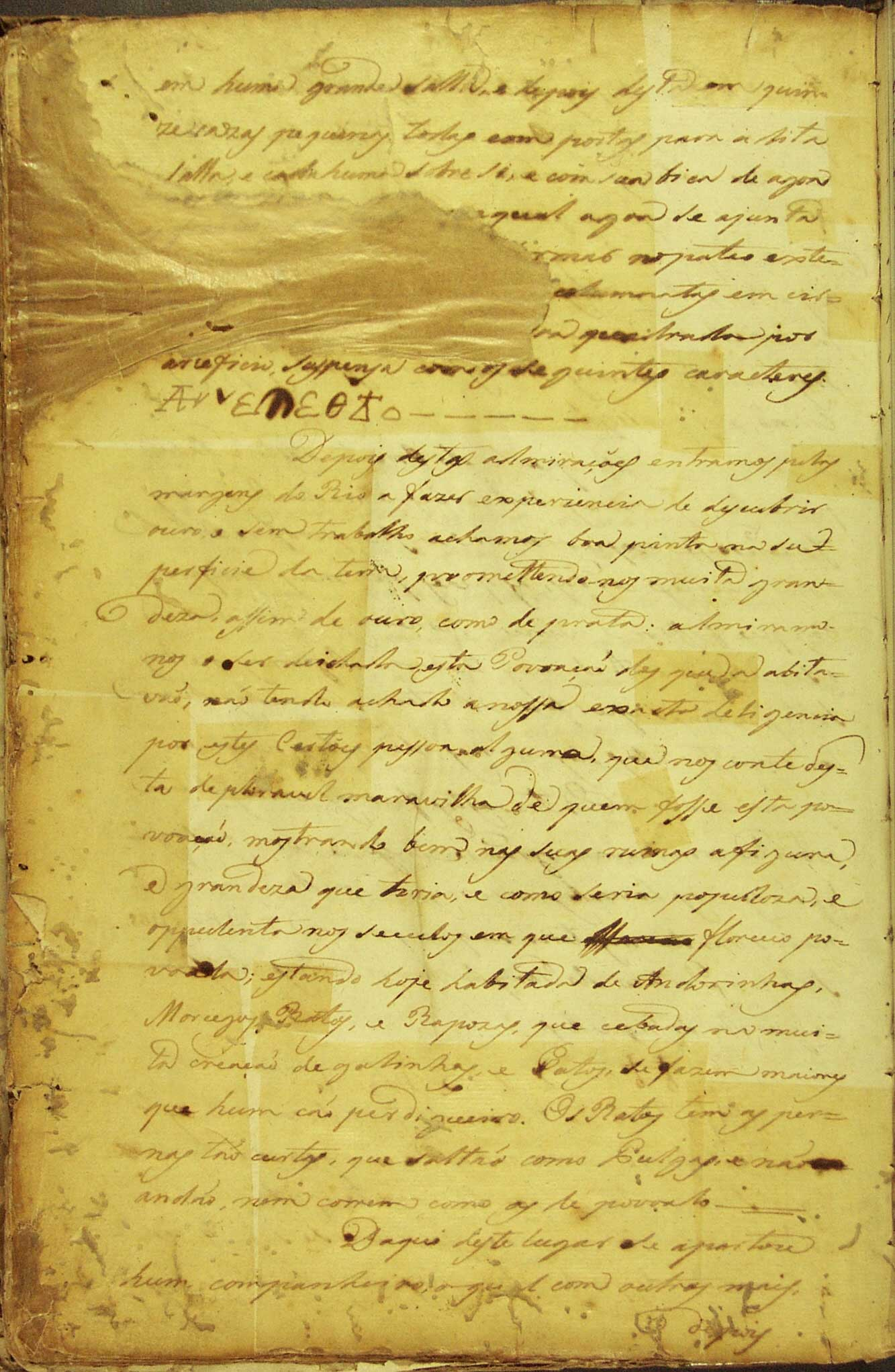
Page 8 of Manuscript 512

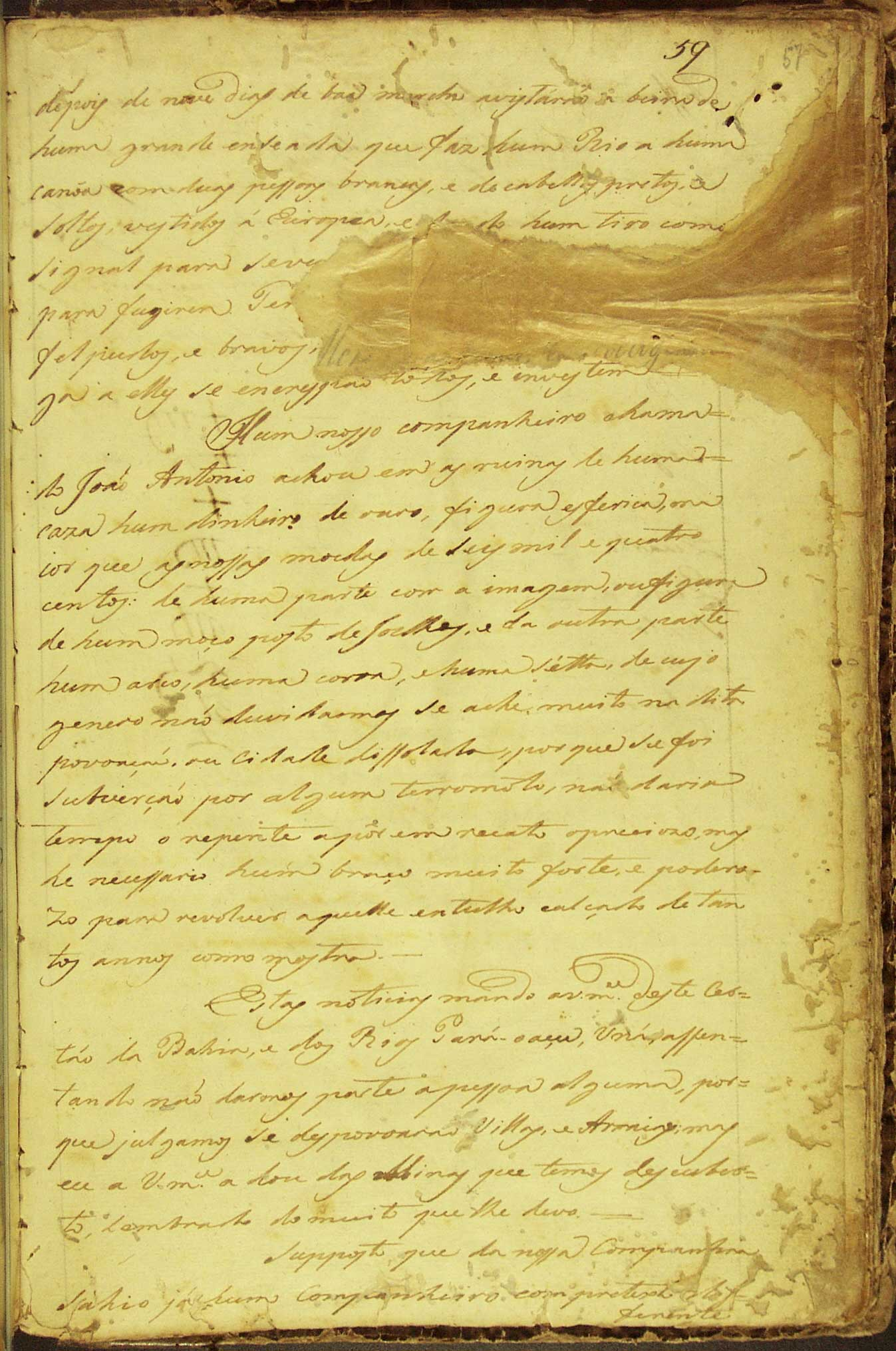
Page 9 of Manuscript 512

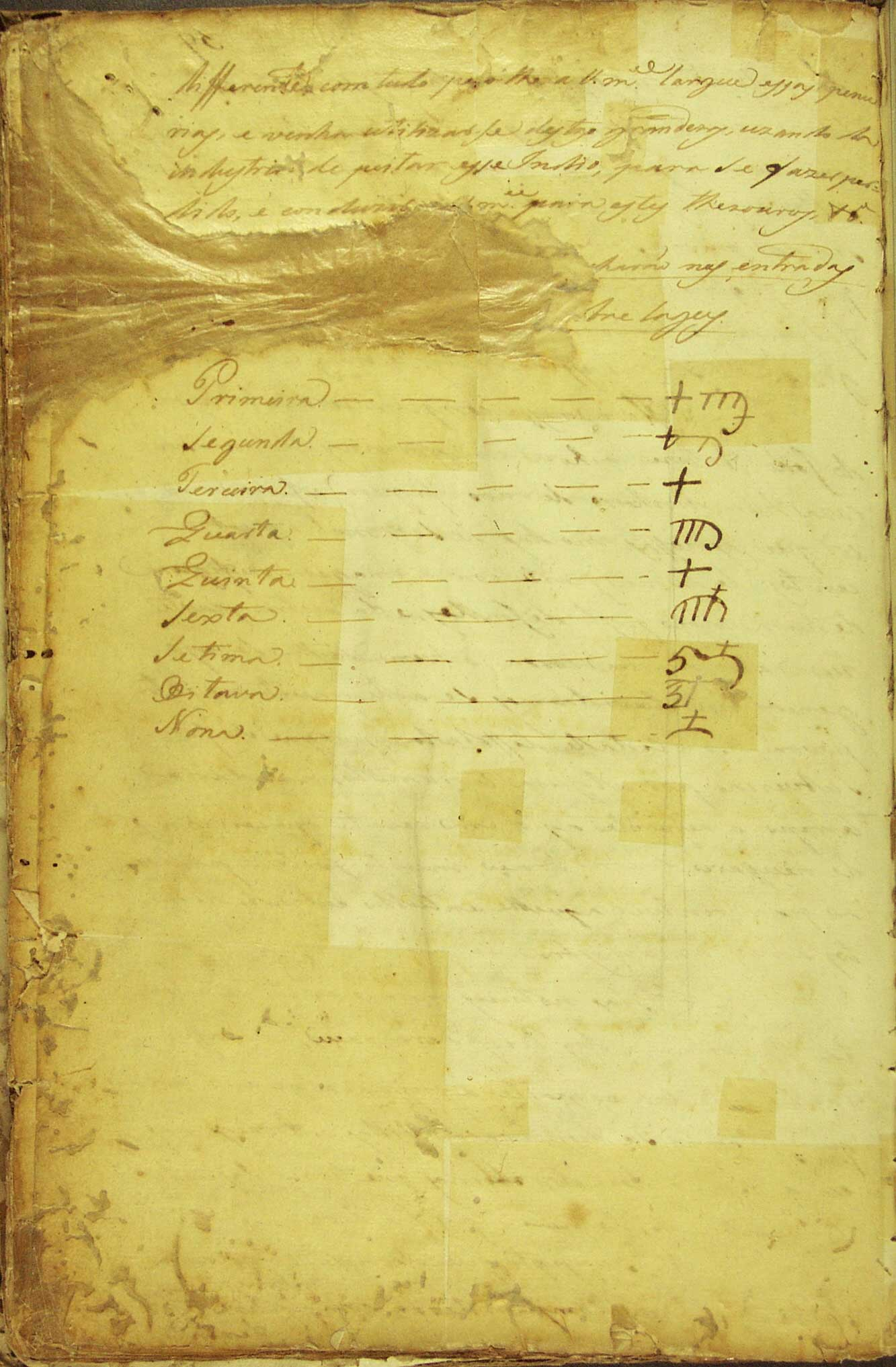
Page 10 of Manuscript 512

== See also ==
- Akakor
- City of the Caesars
- El Dorado
- Kuhikugu
- La Canela
- List of mythological places
- Lost city
- Lost City of Z
- Paititi
- Quivira
- Ratanabá
- Seven Cities of Gold
- Sierra de la Plata
