= La Canela =

Legendary South American location

La Canela, the Valley of Cinnamon, is a legendary location in South America. As with El Dorado, its legend grew out of expectations aroused by the voyage of Christopher Columbus. He had demonstrated to the satisfaction of his backers that gold and spices would be found as a result of his Atlantic crossing; since he himself found little of these commodities, the search on the American mainland continued.

In 1541, Gonzalo Pizarro led an expedition east of Quito with Francisco de Orellana in search of The country of cinnamon ("País de la Canela"). The reason why they took this route was not explained in early narratives (at that time the existence of La Canela was still taken as fact, so no explanation seemed necessary). The reason became clear only on the publication of Pedro Cieza de León's history, which remained in manuscript form until 1871. According to Cieza de León, Gonzalo Díaz de Pineda had recently returned from an exploration of the high Andes. He had found some trees with an aroma of cinnamon, and had understood his informants to say that there were more and better such trees under cultivation not far off to the east. It was these "cinnamon plantations" that Gonzalo hoped to find.

In Quito, Gonzalo was able to recruit 220 Spaniards and 4,000 Native Americans. The second-in-command, Orellana, was sent to Guayaquil to recruit more troops and horses. Gonzalo Pizarro and his followers left Quito on February 1541, a month before Orellana, who was able to bring 23 men and several horses. In March, both met in the valley of Zumaco and started their march towards the crossing of the Andes. After following the courses of the Coca and Napo rivers, the expedition began to run out of provisions. By this time about 140 of the 220 Spaniards and 3,000 out of 4,000 natives had died. They built a boat, and in February 1542 decided that Orellana, along with 50 men, should continue sailing down the Napo in search of food for the whole party.

After vainly awaiting their return Gonzalo eventually admitted that the expedition was a failure. He decided to find a more northerly route back to Quito. He arrived there, two years after his departure, with only 80 surviving companions. Orellana, who never found any large supplies of food and had been unable to return upstream to rejoin the main party, continued down the Napo River to the Amazon River and became the first European to follow the great river all the way to its delta.

The best sources for the expedition are the history of Garcilaso de la Vega, el Inca (Garcilaso grew up in the household of Gonzalo Pizarro and therefore heard his story firsthand) and the narrative of Orellana's chaplain, Gaspar de Carvajal, who took part in the navigation of the Amazon. The narrative in William H. Prescott's History of the Conquest of Peru is elaborated on the basis of Garcilaso.

== See also ==
- Akakor
- City of the Caesars
- El Dorado
- Kuhikugu
- List of mythological places
- Lost city
- Lost City of Z
- Manuscript 512
- Paititi
- Quivira
- Ratanabá
- Seven Cities of Gold
- Sierra de la Plata
