= Sierra de la Plata =

Mythical source of silver in South America

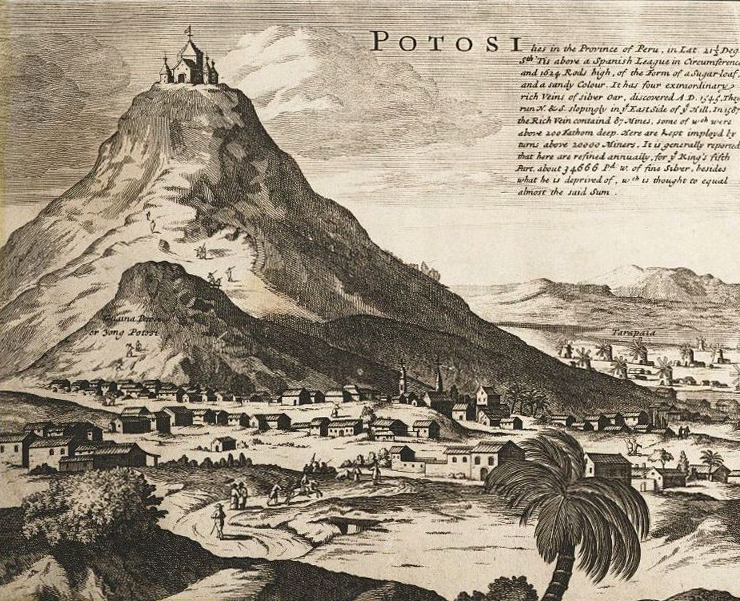
Cerro Rico de Potosí as depicted in 1715, the possible origin of the Sierra de la Plata myth.

The Sierra de la Plata ("Mountain of Silver") was a mythical source of silver in the interior of South America. The legend began in the early 16th century when castaways from the Juan Díaz de Solís expedition heard indigenous stories of a mountain of silver in an inland region ruled by the so-called White King. The first European to lead an expedition in search of it was the castaway Aleixo Garcia, who crossed nearly the entire continent to reach the Andean altiplano. On his way back to the coast, Garcia died in an ambush by indigenous people in Paraguay, but survivors brought precious metals back to corroborate their story.

The legend inspired other expeditions, all of which ended in failure. However, numerous expeditions allowed Spanish Conquistadors to deeply explore the South America portion south of Brazil. The outposts founded during the expeditions gradually evolved into Buenos Aires and Asunción, the lands colonized by the Spanish became Viceroyalty of the Río de la Plata.

Eventually, a Spanish expedition traveling from Peru in 1545 found the Cerro Rico de Potosí in Bolivia, a massive silver deposit deep in the Andes. It is possible that the legend of the Sierra de la Plata was based on the silver mines of Cerro Rico de Potosí.

The river Río de la Plata (literally "Silver River") and the country of Argentina (from the Latin argentum, "silver") both take their names from the legend.

== Origins of the legend ==
=== Juan Díaz de Solís ===
Map from the Miller Atlas (1519) showing the coast of Brazil and the mouths of the Amazon River and the Río de la Plata.

The legend of the White King and the Sierra de la Plata began with the expeditions of Juan Díaz de Solís along the coast of South America. On his first voyage in 1512, Solís followed the coast of Brazil until he came across an enormous estuary, the Río de la Plata, which Amerigo Vespucci had named the River Jordan on his 1501-02 expedition and the local inhabitants called Paranaguazu ("river like the sea" or "great water"). Solís decided to call it the Mar Dulce ("Freshwater Sea") due to its great size. After exploring the area and guessing it could be a strait connecting the Atlantic to the Pacific, Solís returned to Spain to stake his claim as conqueror and governor of the region. In 1516, he returned with the title of Captain General, but when Solís and his party landed on the eastern bank of the Río de la Plata, they were attacked and killed by Guaranís. Seeing this, the crew remaining on the ships decided to weigh anchor and return to Spain.

=== Aleixo Garcia ===
On their way back to Europe, one of the Solís expedition's vessels shipwrecked off the coast of Santa Catarina Island in what is now Brazil, leaving eighteen men stranded. One of them, the Portuguese explorer Aleixo Garcia, became friendly with the local Tupí-Guaranís, and through them learned of a great mountain of shining metals far into the mainland.

Garcia left Santa Catarina along with other castaways and a large indigenous party to search for the Sierra de la Plata, crossing most of South America before reaching the Andean altiplano. This was supposedly the home of the White King, whose throne was entirely decorated with silver. After taking a few valuable pieces, the explorers headed back to the Brazilian coast, but along the way, Aleixo Garcia and the other Europeans were killed in a Payaguá ambush. The few Tupí-Guaranís who managed to escape told their story, showing off the silver pieces they had gotten from the realms of the White King.

== Search for Sierra de la Plata ==
=== Sebastian Cabot ===
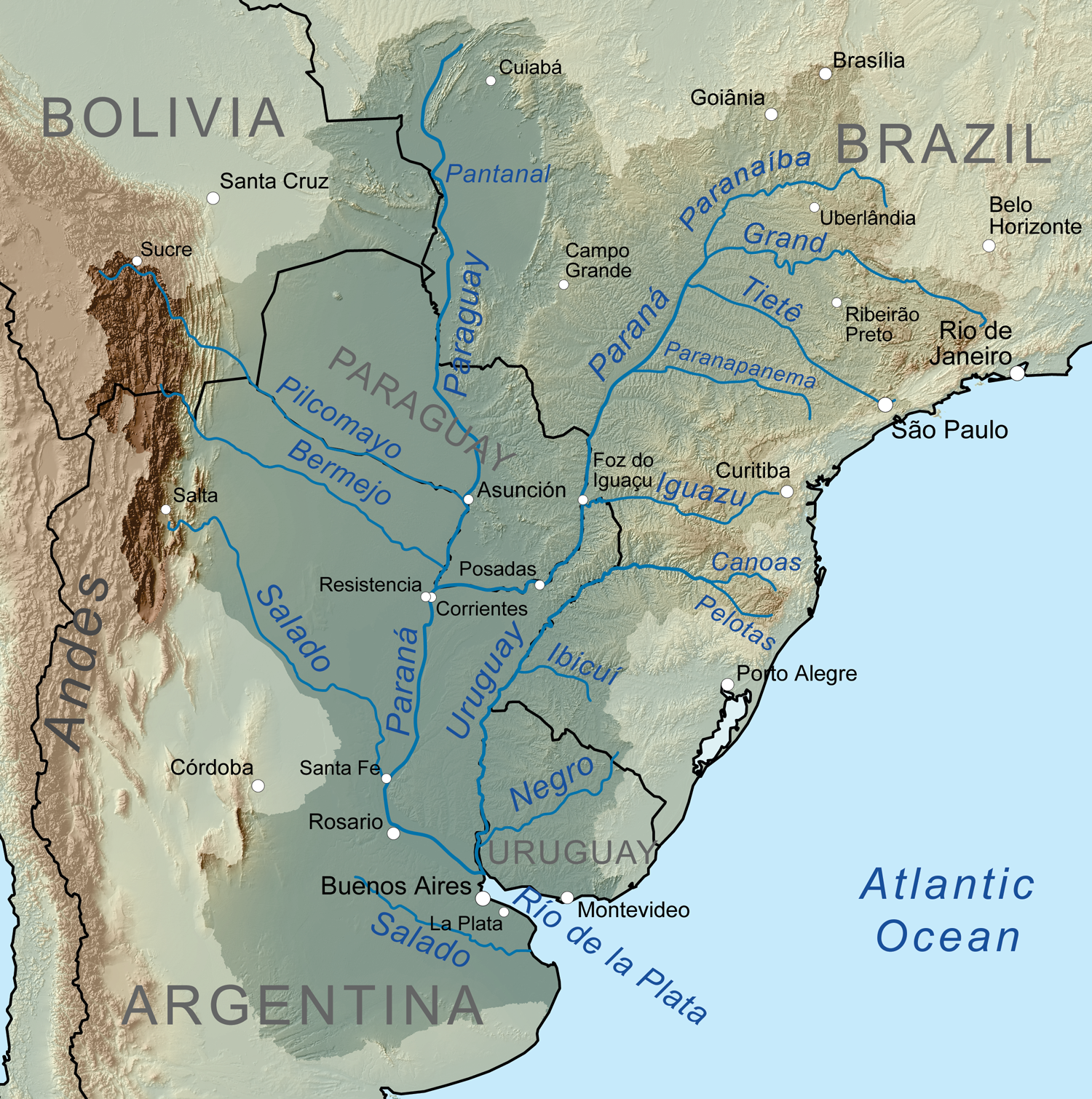
Río de la Plata Basin

In 1526, the Venetian explorer Sebastian Cabot left Spain with the goal of reaching the Molucca Islands in Indonesia by way of the Straits of Magellan. During a stopover in Pernambuco in northern Brazil, he first heard the story about a land rich in precious metals far inland, which could be reached via an enormous estuary further south. The estuary ended up being called the Río de la Plata for its role as the supposed natural gateway to the treasure. The legend captivated Cabot, so he abandoned his mission and decided to find the Sierra de la Plata, assuming that the royal authorities would be indulgent if he found enough silver.

On Santa Catarina, the castaways Melchor Rodríguez and Enrique Morales confirmed the stories, telling Cabot about Aleixo Garcia's expedition and showing him the metals that had been brought back. Cabot headed toward Río de la Plata, where he disembarked to repair two ships that had been damaged in a storm. There, the expedition met former cabin boy Francisco del Puerto, the sole survivor of Solís's landing party. Del Puerto, who was living with the Guaranís, also verified the legend and offered his services as guide and interpreter.

After entering the Río de la Plata, the expedition divided in two: Cabot would continue up the Paraná River and Antón de Grajeda would travel up the Uruguay River. In 1527, at the confluence of the Paraná and Carcarañá Rivers, Cabot established the fort of Sancti Spiritu, the first European settlement in the Río de la Plata basin, and a future base for expeditions to the land of the White King. The party was suffering from hunger and sickness, and since they could not travel by land, they continued north upriver until they landed at an island they named Año Nuevo ("New Year"). There, they traded colored glass with the Timbús for food, but Cabot, thinking he had been shortchanged, ordered his men to kill them, burn their homes, and take their food.

In February 1529, they reached an indigenous town they called Santa Ana, where they were treated hospitably, fed well, and told rumors of other "white men" who were coming up the river behind them. Cabot, however, stuck to his plan and continued up the Paraguay River until strong currents prevented him from going further. There, he had a brigantine sent ahead under the command of Miguel de Rifos. Near the confluence of the Pilcomayo River, Rifos decided to disembark with a few men after being welcomed by some indigenous people on the shore. The Europeans headed through the forest to the village, where they were unexpectedly ambushed. Supposedly, it was a trap arranged by the local chief and Del Puerto, who wanted a larger share of the plunder.

Those who had stayed in the brigantine managed to escape, and when they returned to Cabot, he decided to head back to Sancti Spiritu. On the way, he came across Diego García, the "other white man" he had been told about. García, like Cabot, had been commissioned to travel to the Moluccas, but had deserted when he heard the tales of the White King. After a brief dispute, the two captains decided to join forces to find the Sierra de la Plata, with Cabot in charge of the unified fleet.

At Sancti Spiritu, Captain Francisco César was chosen to explore the local region together with another fifteen soldiers. Three months later César returned with half of his men and a rumor that nearby was a great city full of riches that from then on would be known as the Ciudad de los Césares ("City of the Caesars").

The Sebastian Cabot expedition ended in failure when Cabot and Diego García made their next attempt to find the Sierra de la Plata. The local indigenous people took advantage of their absence to attack and destroy Fort Sancti Spiritu, killing many of his men. Low on morale, food, and supplies, Cabot and his crew were finally forced to give up their goal and return to Europe.

=== Pedro de Mendoza ===
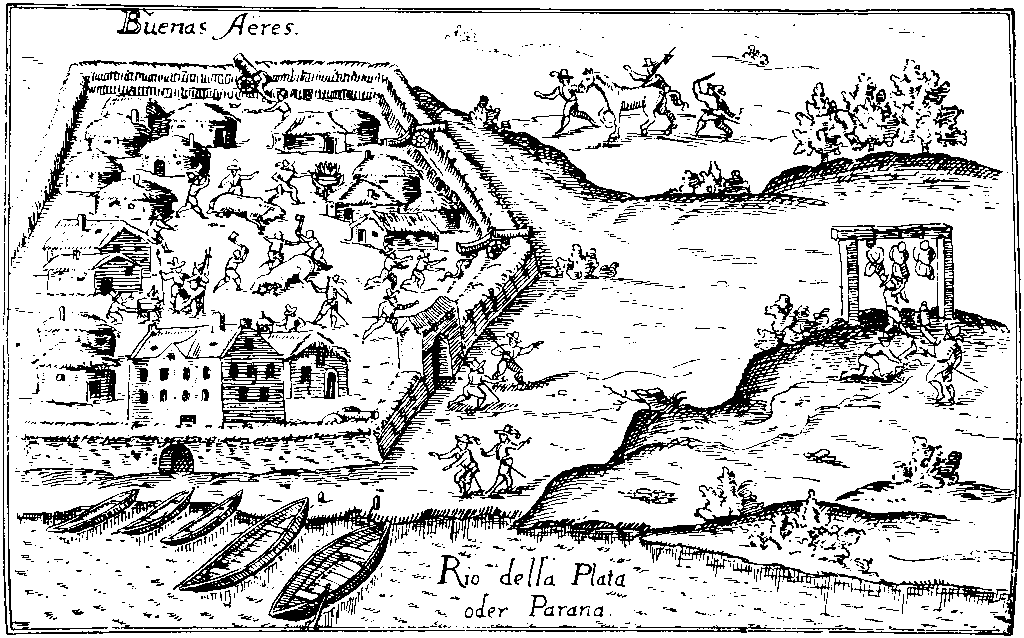
Santa María de los Buenos Ayres, shortly after its foundation in 1536.

In 1534, King Charles I authorized Pedro de Mendoza to "conquer and populate the lands and provinces around the Solís River, which some call the Plate". With fourteen ships and some 1,200 men, it was at the time the largest and most important expedition that had left Europe for America.

In 1536 Pedro de Mendoza founded the port of Santa María de los Buenos Ayres, which was probably located in what is now the Parque Lezama in Buenos Aires. Resources were in short supply to support such a population, and after the Spaniards mistreated the local Querandís, they stopped supplying food to the settlement. Mendoza decided to send out two fleets in search of food: the first, led by his nephew Gonzalo de Mendoza, headed toward Brazil, and the second, led by Juan de Ayolas, went up the River Paraná with three ships and 270 men. Meanwhile, Mendoza ordered his brother Diego to take 300 soldiers and 30 cavalrymen to fight the Querandís. The battle was a failure. Diego de Mendoza was killed, and the Querandís began a long-lasting siege of Buenos Aires. Cut off from supplies, the settlers began to eat their horses and their dead. Finally, the Querandís withdrew, and in a few days, the Juan de Ayolas expedition returned with the news that they had managed to build a fort called Corpus Christi upriver near the modern-day town of Gaboto and had encountered some indigenous people who talked about the Sierra de la Plata. Pedro de Mendoza decided to travel to the fort with Ayolas and some 400 men.

During the voyage, some 200 men died of sickness and hunger, and once they reached Corpus Christi, Mendoza consulted Cabot's map to find that they were still far from their destination. These major setbacks, along with the syphilis he had contracted, convinced Mendoza to return to Europe after a short stop in Buenos Aires.

Pedro de Mendoza died on the open sea on June 23, 1537. Juan de Ayolas, who had left Corpus Christi on October 14, 1536 with a fleet of three brigantines and 170 soldiers, inherited his title of adelantado. Meanwhile, Buenos Aires had overcome its famine thanks to provisions Gonzalo de Mendoza brought from Brazil, and was left under the provisional command of Captain Francisco Ruiz Galán, who ordered the first planting of corn with the goal of making the fort self-sustainable.

=== Juan de Ayolas ===
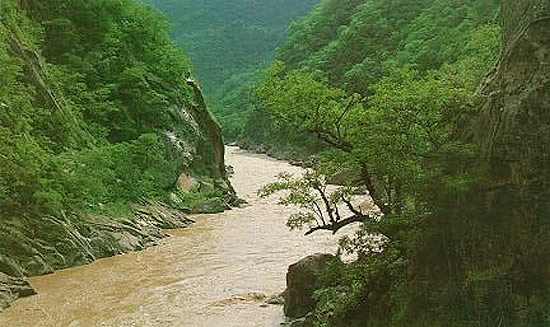
The Pilcomayo river at Tarija, Bolivia.

Before Pedro de Mendoza left Buenos Aires, having no news of the Ayolas expedition, he sent Juan de Salazar Espinosa upriver in search of him. On August 15, 1537, Espinosa established the fort of Nuestra Señora de la Asunción (today Asunción, Paraguay) at the junction of the rivers Paraguay and Pilcomayo.

Meanwhile, Juan de Ayolas was further up the river Paraguay in Payagua territory, where he met one of Aleixo Garcia's former companions, who told him how difficult the journey had been, due to all the gold and silver that weighed them down. Hearing this story, Ayolas decided to found the port of Candelaria on the spot (close to present-day Corumbá) and commissioned Domingo Martínez de Irala as provisional Lieutenant Governor until he returned from an overland expedition with 130 soldiers. After a short time, with no news of Ayola, Irala decided to abandon his post and return downriver to the fort of Asunción.

However, the Juan de Ayolas expedition had successfully reached a mountainous area where precious metals were mined. On his return trip, his party suffered losses from skirmishes with Indigenous people, and before he reached the Paraguay River, he ordered his men to bury most of the treasure they carried. When he returned, he was disappointed to find the port of Candelaria abandoned, so he accepted the invitation of the Payaguas to rest in their village. On his way there, a fight broke out between the Spaniards and the local people, and almost the entire expedition was killed, including Juan de Ayolas.

After this, Domingo Martínez de Irala became the expedition's new leader, and he took up the goal of conquering the Sierra de la Plata and the lands of the White King. Irala decided to convert Asunción into the headquarters of the conquest, and ordered the colonists at Buenos Aires to tear down their buildings and move to Asunción. However, their newly planted corn was yielding a good crop, and they refused to move. Six months later, Irala disembarked at Buenos Aires to carry out the order. The first settlement at Buenos Aires was finally destroyed and abandoned in 1541.

=== Álvar Núñez Cabeza de Vaca ===
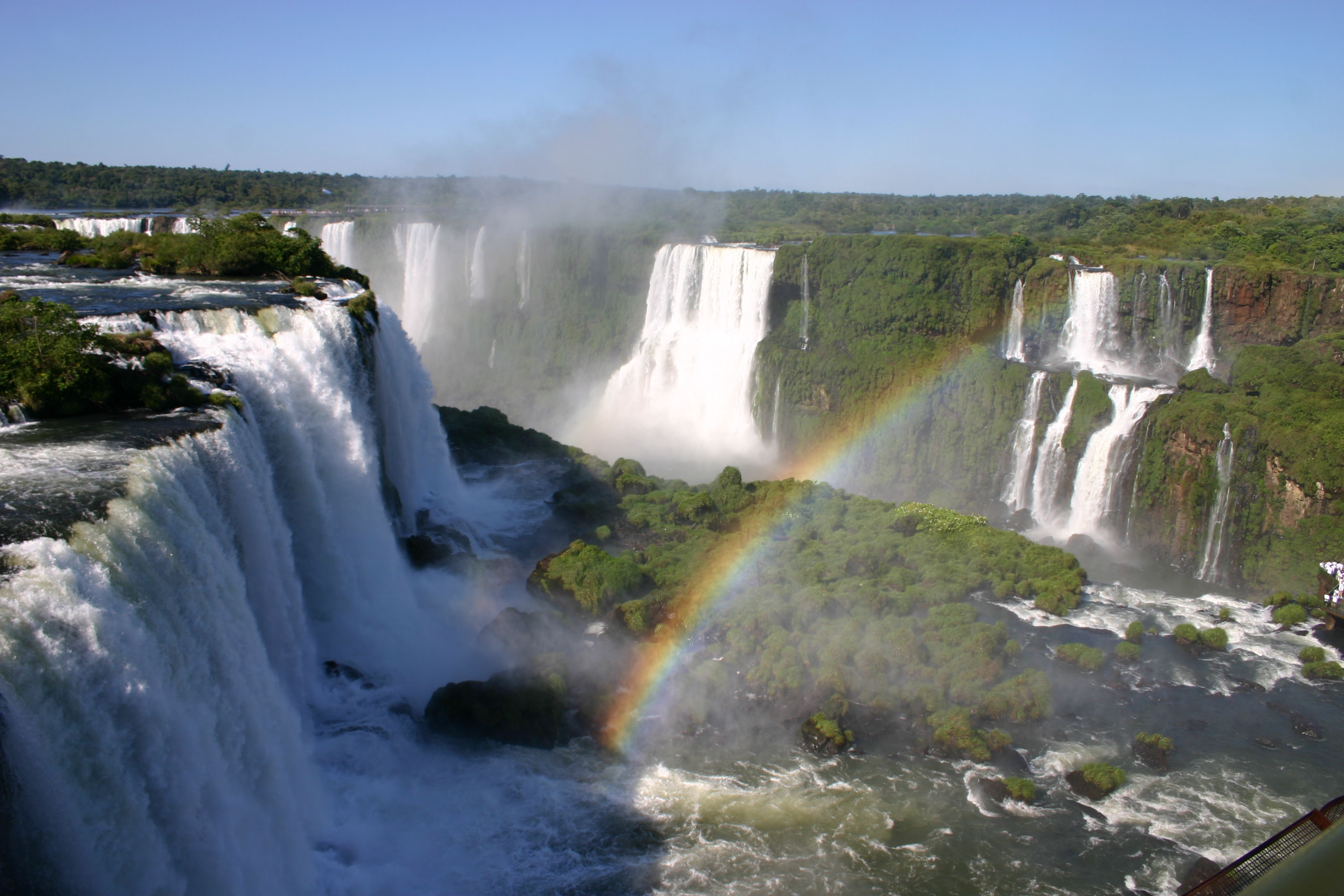
Iguazú Falls on the border of Argentina and Brazil.

While Irala was preparing his expedition to the Sierra de la Plata, Spain had chosen Álvar Núñez Cabeza de Vaca as the official successor to Pedro de Mendoza's title of adelantado. Known for his long residence among the Indians of modern-day Texas and northern Mexico, Cabeza de Vaca decided to cross Paraguay on foot rather than travel by boat up the Río de la Plata. In October 1541, his expedition left Santa Catalina, crossing jungles, mountains, and rivers to reach Asunción. In January 1542, they passed Iguazú Falls and on March 11, 1542, they reached Asunción, where they met Domingo Martínez de Irala.

Cabeza de Vaca clashed with the colonists at Asunción, calling the village a "Moorish paradise," as each colonist had taken multiple indigenous women as wives.

Soon, Cabeza de Vaca began to prepare an expedition to the lands of the White King. First, he sent Irala up the Paraguay River to see if it led to the Sierra de la Plata. He reached La Gaiba Lake in the Pantanal region, where he founded the Puerto de los Reyes. In September 1543, Cabeza de Vaca led his own expedition through the forest, but sickness and clashes with his officers, mostly Irala's men, convinced him to abandon his search and return to Asunción.

With his authority undermined and disliked by the colonists, the Captain General was soon overthrown. On April 25, 1544, Irala's men entered Cabeza de Vaca's house and took him prisoner. Eleven months later, he was sent to Spain on a ship under the command of Gonzalo de Mendoza. During the voyage, a violent storm broke out, which the superstitious sailors interpreted as divine punishment, so they decided to free all of their prisoners. In Spain, Cabeza de Vaca denounced the colonists' actions to the court, but the case was never resolved, and he never returned to the Americas.

=== Domingo Martínez de Irala ===
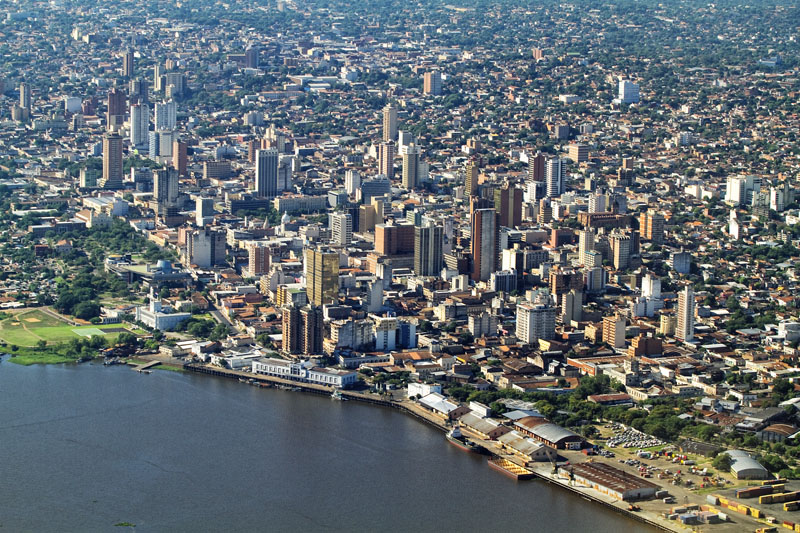
View of modern-day Asunción, Paraguay.

With his authority confirmed, Domingo Martínez de Irala organized an expedition of 300 Spanish men and 3,000 Indigenous men in search of the Sierra de la Plata. After a few battles with Indigenous peoples, Irala's men reached a tribe of Macasís, who immediately began speaking to them in Spanish. They told them their lord was Pedro Anzures, and therefore they were out of their jurisdiction. Irala sent a party to speak with the governor of Peru, Pedro de la Gasca, who only ordered the expedition to go no further under pain of death, so they had no choice but to return to Asunción.

Irala organized several other expeditions to legendary locations like the "Land of Riches", the "Lake of El Dorado", and "Paititi". All of these expeditions ended in failure, with great cost in human lives and materials. Meanwhile, the king named Juan de Sanabria as the new adelantado in the region, but he died during preparations and was replaced by his son Diego, who ended up staying in Europe even though several of his ships had already sailed. Finally, the crown decided to formalize Irala's de facto power, so as Irala was preparing his next expedition, a royal emissary arrived in Asunción, informing Irala that he had been named governor of the Governorate of New Andalusia (also known as the Governorate of the Río de la Plata and Paraguay) with express orders not to lead any more expeditions. With Buenos Aires destroyed and the Sierra de la Plata under another jurisdiction, Paraguay experienced a long period of isolation under Irala, who finally died in October 1556 at the age of 70.

== Cerro Rico de Potosí ==
The Sierra de la Plata legend likely corresponds to the Cerro Rico de Potosí in Bolivia, and the White King to the Sapa Inca Huayna Cápac. When Aleixo Garcia explored the region and discovered precious metals in the early 16th century, Spain had barely begun colonizing the coasts of Panama and Colombia, and Portugal had barely begun colonizing the coast of Brazil. Neither of the two crowns knew about the existence of the Inca Empire until Francisco Pizarro encountered it in 1528, traveling from the Pacific coast.

King Charles I tried to solve conflicts between conquistadors by dividing South America into several governorates: New Castile, under Francisco Pizarro, which reached from the Santiago River, Ecuador to Pisco, Peru; New Toledo, under Diego de Almagro, from Pisco to Taltal, Chile; and New Andalusia, under Pedro de Mendoza, two hundred leagues south. Of these three, it was Almagro's men who first found the Cerro Rico de Potosí.

== See also ==
- Akakor
- Antillia
- City of the Caesars
- El Dorado
- Kuhikugu
- La Canela
- La Plata Mountains
- List of mythological places
- Lost city
- Lost City of Z
- Manuscript 512
- Paititi
- Quivira
- Ratanabá
- Seven Cities of Gold
