= Lost City of Z =

Hypothesized city in the Mato Grosso region of Brazil

The Lost City of Z is the name given by Lt. Colonel Percy Harrison Fawcett, a British surveyor of the early 20th century, to an indigenous city that he believed had existed in the jungle of the Mato Grosso state of Brazil. Based on early histories of South America and his own explorations of the Amazon River region, Fawcett theorized that a complex civilization had once existed there, and that isolated ruins may have survived. Fawcett and two companions disappeared during an expedition to find evidence of the hypothesized civilization in 1925.

== History ==
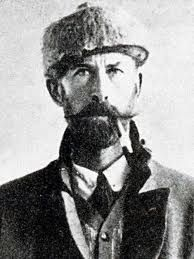
The British surveyor Percy Fawcett in 1911, who believed an indigenous city, which he called "the Lost City of Z", had existed in the Brazilian jungle

Fawcett found a document known as Manuscript 512, held at the National Library of Brazil, attributed to Portuguese bandeirante João da Silva Guimarães, but of dubious veracity. According to the document, in 1753, a group of bandeirantes discovered the ruins of an ancient city that contained Greco-Roman architecture, arches, a statue, and a temple with hieroglyphs, as well as a mountainous range described "Brazilian Alps". He described the city ruins in great detail without giving its location.

Manuscript 512 was written after explorations made in the sertão of the province of Bahia. Fawcett intended to pursue finding this city as a secondary goal after "Z". He was preparing an expedition to find "Z" when World War I broke out and the British government suspended its support. Fawcett returned to Britain and served on the Western Front during the war.

In 1920, after the war ended, Fawcett undertook a personal expedition to Mato Grosso, rather than Bahia, to find the city, but withdrew after suffering from fever and having to shoot his pack animal. On a second expedition in 1925, Fawcett, his son Jack, and Jack's friend Raleigh Rimmel disappeared while exploring the jungles of Mato Grosso.

=== Urban centers in central South America ===
Some researchers believe that Fawcett may have been influenced in his thinking by information obtained from indigenous people about the archaeological site of Kuhikugu, near the headwaters of the Xingu River.

In 2022, the remains of Casarabe culture settlements were found in Bolivia at the Llanos de Moxos savannah, and were surveyed using lidar. While not in Brazil or near Fawcett’s proposed location for “Z”, the sites contain the ruins of mounds, causeways, and other infrastructure, supporting Fawcett's theory about ancient settlements in the region. However, the settlements found in Llanos de Moxos do not fit the description or location given by Manuscript 512.

== In popular culture ==
The city is the focus of the 1991 novel Indiana Jones and the Seven Veils.

In 2005, the American journalist David Grann published an article in The New Yorker on Fawcett's expeditions and findings, titled "The Lost City of Z". In 2009 he developed it into a book of the same title, and in 2016 it was adapted by writer-director James Gray into a film of the same name starring Charlie Hunnam, Robert Pattinson, Tom Holland, and Sienna Miller. In 2019, "The Lost City of Z" was mentioned in episode 133 of the podcast The Magnus Archives, in the form of a fictional retelling of the expedition of Colonel Percy Harrison Fawcett.

== See also ==
- Lost city
- List of mythological places
- Akakor – Mythical South American underground city
- City of the Caesars – Mythical city in South America
- El Dorado – Legendary city in South America
- La Canela – Legendary South American location
- Paititi – Legendary Inca lost city
- Quivira – Province of the American Wichita people
- Ratanabá – Brazilian conspiracy theory
- Seven Cities of Gold – North American myth popular among 16th-century conquistadors
- Sierra de la Plata – Mythical source of silver in South America

== Sources ==
- Fawcett, Percy Harrison (1953). Fawcett, Brian (ed.). Lost Trails, Lost Cities. New York: Funk & Wagnalls. LCCN 53006980. OL 6134053M.
- Furneaux, Rupert (1961). The World's Strangest Mysteries: Happenings that Have Intrigued and Baffled Millions. Odhams Press.
- Thorpe, Vanessa (21 March 2004). "Veil lifts on jungle mystery of the colonel who vanished". The Observer. ISSN 0029-7712.
- Warren, Smith (1976). Lost cities of the ancients—unearthed!. New York, NY: Kensington Pub. ISBN 978-0-89083162-5. OCLC 3249761.
- "Books: Fawcett of the Mato Grosso". Time. Vol. XLI, no. 21. 25 May 1953.
