= Seven Cities of Gold =

North American myth popular among 16th-century conquistadors

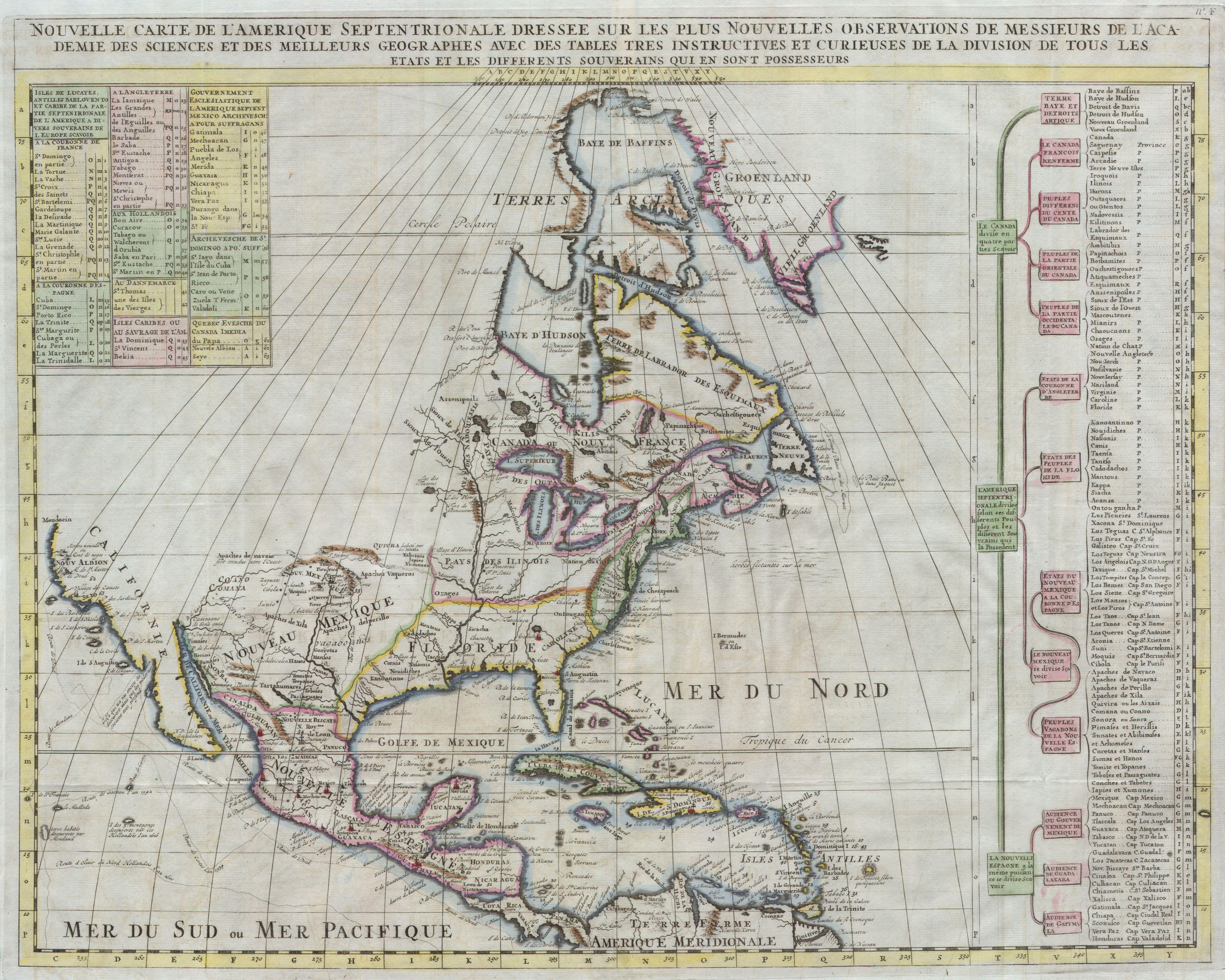
1720 North America Geographicus by Dutch cartographer Henri Abraham Chatelain

The myth of the Seven Cities of Gold, also known as the Seven Cities of Cíbola (/ˈsiːbələ/), was popular in the 16th century and later featured in several works of popular culture. According to legend, the seven cities of gold referred to Aztec mythology revolving around the Pueblos of the Spanish Nuevo México, modern New Mexico and Southwestern United States.

Besides "Cíbola", names associated with similar lost cities of gold also included El Dorado, Paititi, City of the Caesars, Lake Parime at Manoa, Antilia, and Quivira.

== Origins of myth/legend ==
In the 16th century, the Spaniards in New Spain (Mexico) began to hear rumors of "Seven Cities of Gold" called "Cíbola" located across the desert, hundreds of miles to the north. The stories may have their root in an earlier Portuguese legend about seven cities founded on the island of Antillia by a Catholic expedition in the 8th century, or one based on the capture of Mérida, Spain, by the Moors in 1150.

The later Spanish tales were largely caused by reports given by the four shipwrecked survivors of the failed Narváez expedition, which included explorers Álvar Núñez Cabeza de Vaca and Estevanico. Eventually returning to New Spain, Estevanico then ventured back north and reports of him contained references to cities with great and limitless riches. In 1539, Italian Franciscan Marco da Nizza reached Zuni Pueblo and called it Cibola. Explorers in the 1540's who discovered the San Francisco Peaks in Arizona chose to press on in search of the legendary cities, although when conquistador Francisco Vázquez de Coronado arrived at Cíbola in 1540, he discovered that the stories were unfounded and that there were, in fact, no treasures as the friar had described, only adobe towns.

While among the towns, Coronado heard an additional rumor from a native he called "the Turk": that there was a city with plenty of gold called Quivira, located on the other side of the Great Plains, but when at last he reached this place (variously conjectured to be in modern Kansas, Nebraska, or Missouri), he found little more than straw-thatched villages.

The historic Cíbola on the other hand is recorded in Spanish sources as another name for the Zuñi pueblo and the surrounding country. The Spanish soon discovered rich copper and turquoise mines in the Pueblo country which made the region famous for its mineral wealth even in recent times. The Pueblo Indians, including the Zuñi, are still well known for their turquoise and silver work.

== In popular culture ==
=== Literature ===
- The novel The King's Fifth by Scott O'Dell tells the story of one such (fictional) expedition through the eyes of a teenage cartographer.
- Texas (1985) by James A. Michener references the site as a background to early Spanish exploration.
- In The Stand by Stephen King, Trashcan Man is instructed by Randall Flagg to meet him in Cibola, which is later revealed to be Las Vegas.
- Edward Abbey's autobiographical recount of his summer as a park ranger at Arches National Park, Desert Solitaire, contains a reference to "seven modern cities of Cibola" including Phoenix, Tucson, Albuquerque, and Flagstaff.
- Romance author Kristin Hannah's The Enchantment (1992) is about a quest for the legendary lost city of Cibola in the late 1800s.
- Cibola Burn is the fourth book in the science fiction novel series The Expanse by James S. A. Corey. The novel describes the flood of humanity out into the galaxy and the race for the newly accessible resources therein.

=== Films ===
- The 1955 film Seven Cities of Gold starring Richard Egan, Anthony Quinn, and Michael Rennie tells the story of a 1769 Spanish expedition to California led by Gaspar De Portola to search of gold and to set up Spanish colonies. Father Junipero Serra, however, is there to set up a network of Roman Catholic missions.
- The 1958 film The Lone Ranger and the Lost City of Gold, starring Clayton Moore and Jay Silverheels, features three medallions which combine to make a treasure map revealing the location of a hoard of gold.
- The 1992 film ¡O No Coronado! by Craig Baldwin details Coronado's ill-fated expedition, in the context of contemporary treatment of indigenous Americans and usage of their traditional lands.
- Cíbola was discovered beneath Mount Rushmore in National Treasure: Book of Secrets, a 2007 film starring Nicolas Cage and Diane Kruger.

=== Television ===
- The quest for Cíbola was in a 1966 episode of the U.S. television series Daniel Boone with Fess Parker.
- The Mysterious Cities of Gold is a 1982 Japanese/French animated children's series which spawned a sequel in 2012.

=== Music ===
- "Seven Cities of Gold" is the seventh track on the Clockwork Angels album by Rush. The lyrics were inspired by lyricist Neil Peart's fascination for southwestern US history.

=== Comics ===
- Scrooge McDuck and his nephews discover the seven cities in the comic "The Seven Cities of Cibola" (Uncle Scrooge #7, September 1954), written and drawn by Carl Barks.
- The Vertigo/DC comic book series Jack of Fables has a storyline called "Americana" which relates the efforts of Jack of the Tales in entering Cíbola.
- There is an arc in the Italian Western/science fiction comic Zagor about seven cities of gold which were abandoned and were remnants of an ancient highly developed civilization (Zagor #355-357, ITA/CRO: "Le sette città di Cibola" / "Sedam gradova Cibole").
- In the albums Beyond the Windy Isles and Celtic Tales (respectively 1970–1971 and 1971–1972), Hugo Pratt puts Corto Maltese on the track of these cities.

=== Video games ===
- Electronic Arts published the video game The Seven Cities of Gold in 1984.
- The video game Uncharted: Golden Abyss uses Quivira (one of the Seven Cities of Gold) as a final destination for the quest. The game also gives an explanation why Marcos de Niza lied about the location of the cities even though he really did find them.
- The video game Europa Universalis IV has the El Dorado expansion which gives colonizing nations the ability to hunt for the Seven Cities of Gold in the New World.
- In the turn-based strategy game Sid Meier's Colonization (1994), scouting lost city ruins (tiles in the map) may result in finding one or more of the Seven Cities of Cibola, granting the player a treasure with a huge amount of gold.
- The Western genre game Gun centers on a land baron's search for Quivira in the 1880s.
- In Civilization Revolution, players can find the Seven Cities of Gold. The player who finds the Seven Cities of Gold receives 200 to 350 gold pieces, depending on the era, to spend on building cities, military units, settlers (people who found new cities) or roads.
- In the turn-based strategy game Sid Meier's Civilization V, the Spanish unique ability is called Seven Cities of Gold, where the player receives bonus gold for discovering natural wonders.

== See also ==
- Akakor
- City of the Caesars
- El Dorado
- Kuhikugu
- La Canela
- List of mythological places
- Lost city
- Lost City of Z
- Manuscript 512
- Paititi
- Quivira
- Ratanabá
- Shambhala
- Shangdu
- Shangri-La
- Sierra de la Plata
