= Karl Brugger =

German foreign correspondent for the ARD network and author

- Born: 1941; Munich, Nazi Germany
- Died: 3 January 1984 (aged 42–43); Rio de Janeiro, Brazil
- Cause of death: Ballistic trauma
- Occupations: Author, journalist
- Known for: Victim of unsolved murder

Karl Brugger (1941, Munich – 3 January 1984, Rio de Janeiro) was a German foreign correspondent for the ARD network and author, best known for his book The Chronicle of Akakor about the alleged lost city of Akakor that was published in 1976.

== Biography ==
Brugger was born in Munich and studied journalism and contemporary history there and in Paris. On 3 March 1972, while Brugger was a correspondent in Rio, in a tavern of Manaus, the Graças a Deus, met Tatunca Nara, an Indian "cacique", allegedly called the "Prince of Akakor". Brugger worked as a freelance journalist before becoming a correspondent in Brazil for the ARD from 1974.

== Death ==
Brugger was killed in Rio de Janeiro on 3 January 1984 after being shot several times, while walking with his friend Ulrich Encke on the Ipanema beach. Neither his killer, nor the motive for his killing, is known. A man named Wolfgang Seibenhaar had thoroughly investigated the mystery of Brugger's murder and was also questioned to if he knew anything about it, but was unable to find out or give any information. It was also believed that his murder was a robbery, but this was later disputed, as nothing was said to have been taken from Brugger.

== See also ==
- List of unsolved murders (1980–1999)
- Karl Brugger at IMDb
