= Rüdiger Nehberg =

German survivalist (1935–2020)

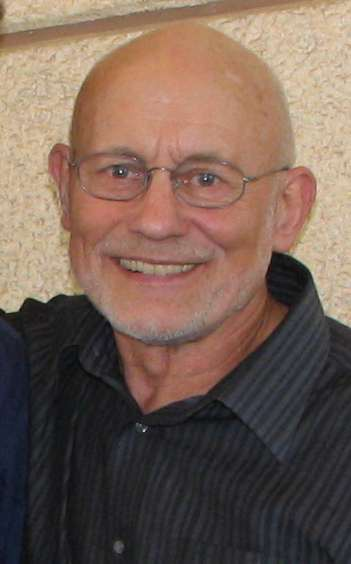
Nehberg in 2007

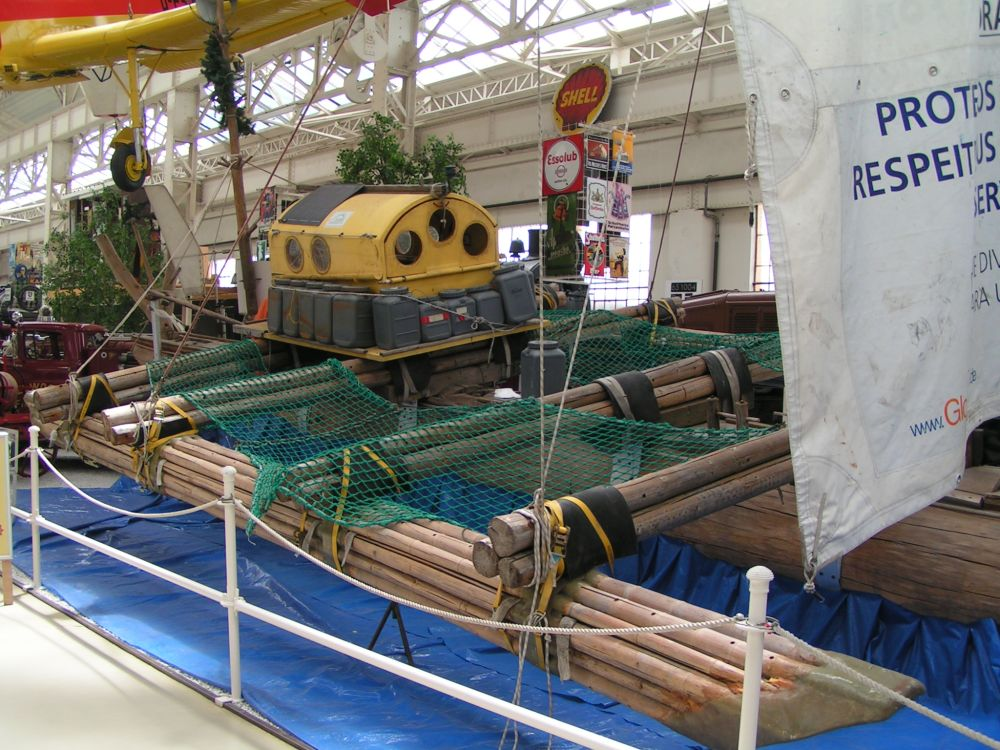
The Tree

Rüdiger Nehberg, also known as 'Sir Vival', (4 May 1935 – 1 April 2020) was a German human rights activist, author and survival expert. He was the founder and chairman of the anti-FGM organization TARGET, and chairman of the organizations Friends of Peoples Close to Nature (German section – Freunde der Naturvölker) and Rettet den Regenwald (Save the Rainforest). He lived in Rausdorf near Hamburg, Germany. Nehberg described himself as having "No astrological sign, no church, no hair, and no clip in the ear (the latter means: he is a maverick)".

== Life and work ==
Nehberg was born in Bielefeld. After school, Nehberg initially became a pastry chef by trade, but increasingly turned his attention to outdoor survival. He would finally sell his three bakeries and live from his books and lectures.

In 1972, together with two friends, one of whom was shot dead in an ambush, he became one of the first to travel the length of the Blue Nile in a home-made boat. Since 1980, he has been involved in defending the interests of the Yanomami Amerindian tribe. With his enterprise, "The Tree" (crossing the Atlantic Ocean on a fir-tree in 2000), he contributed to the provision of a protected reservation for the Yanomami. In 1981 – followed by a camera team – he crisscrossed Germany without any special equipment and relying for his sustenance solely on what he was able to find in nature. In 1987, Nehberg crossed the Atlantic Ocean in a pedal boat.

He was also one of the first to discredit the fraudulent "Tatunca Nara" story, which had gained publicity in the German and Brazilian media. A German worker named Hans Günther Hauck left his home near Nuremberg in 1967, moved into the Brazilian jungle, and proclaimed himself the leader of the secret Ugha-Mongulala tribe, which had lived hidden in the secret jungle city of Akakor for 15,000 years. Neither the city nor the tribe ever existed. Nevertheless, many filmmakers and adventure-loving men and women believed Nara, and three people even died during Tatunca-led jungle excursions. The circumstances that led to their deaths have never been fully revealed. In Nehberg's book Der selbstgemachte Häuptling (The Self-Made Chieftain), the whole story of this mysterious man and his deeds can be read.

In September 2000, he founded the human rights organization TARGET to prevent the practice of female genital mutilation (FGM). For his commitment to endangered peoples, Nehberg was awarded the Bundesverdienstkreuz ("Federal Cross for Merit"). In November 2006, TARGET organized and financed a conference under the patronage of the Egyptian Great Mufti Ali Gomaa at Al-Azhar University of Cairo. As a result of the conference, leading authorities of Islamic law denounced genital mutilation.

In March 2009, Rüdiger Nehberg and Tarafa Baghajati met Sheikh Prof. Dr. Yusuf al-Qaradawi in Qatar, one of the best known Islamic contemporary authority scholars. They obtained a fatwa issued by the recognized legal scholar, stating that genital mutilation of girls is referred to and forbidden as "devil's work" because it is directed against the ethics of Islam.

In August 2009 Nehberg married his second wife.

In February 2011, Rüdiger Nehberg and Tarafa Baghajati met with Sheikh Prof. Dr. Mohamed Said Ramadan Al-Bouti and obtained a similar fatwa against female genital mutilation. In 2014 he gave a TEDx talk about his work to prevent FGM.

== Works ==
- Survival-Lexikon, ISBN 3-492-23055-5
- Drei Mann, ein Boot, zum Rudolfsee, ISBN 3-492-22714-7
- Abenteuer am Blauen Nil, ISBN 3-492-23251-5
- Mit dem Baum über den Atlantik, ISBN 3-492-23607-3
- Die Kunst zu Überleben, Survival, ISBN 3-492-22622-1
- Survival, ISBN 3-492-22717-1
- Survival-Abenteuer vor der Haustür, ISBN 3-492-22715-5
- Überleben ums Verrecken, ISBN 3-89029-219-4
- Echt verrückt!, ISBN 3-89029-264-X
- Die Yanomami-Indianer, ISBN 3-492-23922-6
- Abenteuer Urwald, ISBN 3-89029-286-0
- Abenteuergeschichten, ISBN 3-453-01855-9
- Rüdiger Nehberg – Die Autobiographie, ISBN 3-89029-297-6
