= Tatunca Nara =

German-Brazilian jungle guide and self-styled Indian chieftain

Tatunca Nara, born Hans Günther Hauck (born 5 October 1941 in Coburg), is a German jungle guide and self-styled Indian chieftain, best known for inventing the stories of the lost city of Akakor.

== Personal life ==
In the late 1980s, Germany's Federal Criminal Police Office confirmed that "Tatunca Nara" was born as Günther Hauck in Coburg, Bavaria, and disappeared in the early 1960s due to financial difficulties. He left a wife and three children in Nuremberg. Nara denied that he is Hauck.

According to Nara, Tatunca means "big water snake". He lives in Barcelos, Amazonas on the Rio Negro. His Brazilian ID card lists him as an Indian.

== Akakor, disappearances, and deaths ==
In the 1970s, German foreign correspondent Karl Brugger met "Tatunca Nara", who told him of the history of Akakor, an underground city below the Amazon rainforest. Brugger was convinced and wrote "The Chronicle of Akakor“, published in 1976.

Still working as a jungle guide, Tatunca Nara led tourists and adventurers looking for pyramids and the underground city, but questions were raised after several of his clients went missing: John Reed from the US in 1980, Herbert Wanner of Switzerland in 1983, and Swede Christine Heuser in 1987. All disappeared in mysterious circumstances. In 1984, a skull was found by Swiss tourists which could be identified by forensic analysis as Herbert Wanner. In the same year, Brugger was shot and killed by an unknown assailant in the streets of Rio de Janeiro. The German Police believe Tatunca was behind the killing.

In 1990, German adventurer Rüdiger Nehberg and film producer Wolfgang Brög tricked Tatunca into taking them on an expedition, during which his story began to unravel. The result was an hour-long documentary Das Geheimnis des Tatunca Nara ('The Mystery of Tatunca Nara'), shown on the ARD network in 1991.

Nara stated, "I've killed many people, but I was a soldier and they were carrying weapons. I'm not innocent. But I didn't kill those three, as they've accused me of doing."

== Bibliography ==
- Karl Brugger/Tatunca Nara, the chronicle of Akakor. Told of Tatunca Nara, the chieftain of the Ugha Mongulala, 2000, ISBN 3-930219-28-X
- Wolfgang Brög, “Das Geheimnis des Tatunca Nara”. Documentary, 58 min. WDR 1990, DVD with iris film.
- Ruediger Nehberg, “Jungle Adventure”, Malik publishing house, ISBN 3-89029-286-0
