= Akilineq =

Inuit toponym

Akilineq is an Inuit language toponym meaning the opposite country, which has variously been theorized to be a mythical place, an area in northeastern North America, or possibly even Europe.

One theory notes that the term was used in West Greenland to refer to the territories across Davis Strait, such as the Labrador Peninsula and Baffin Island.

Renee Fosset notes that Gustav Holm of the 1880s Danish polar expedition recorded east Greenlanders as describing Akilineq as a land far to the east, which by evidence Holm took to refer to Iceland.

The term was also used to refer to one or several trading sites where the Inuit and neighbouring peoples would meet, by the Akilineq Hills at the mouth of the Thelon River, or on the north shores of Lake Aberdeen.
