= List of mythological places =

This is a list of mythological places which appear in mythological tales, folklore, and varying religious texts.

== Egyptian mythology ==
Name	Description
Aaru	The heavenly paradise often referred to as the Field Of Reeds, is an underworld realm where Osiris rules in ancient Egyptian mythology.
Akhet	An Egyptian hieroglyph that represents the sun rising over a mountain. It is translated as "horizon" or "the place in the sky where the sun rises".
Benben	The mound that arose from the primordial waters Nu upon which the creator deity Atum settled in the creation myth of the Heliopolitan form of ancient Egyptian religion.
Duat	The Underworld and abode of the dead in Ancient Egyptian religion.
The Indestructibles	Two bright stars which, at that time, could always be seen circling the North Pole by ancient Egyptian astronomers.
Land of Manu	Western abode of the sun god Ra.
Nun	The primordial waters from which the Benben arose at the beginning of the universe, also considered to be a god Nu.

== Greek mythology ==
Name	Description
Arcadia	A vision of pastoralism and harmony with nature, derived from the Greek province Arkadia which dates to antiquity.
Asphodel Meadows	The section of the underworld where ordinary souls were sent to live after death.
Atlantis	The legendary (and almost archetypal) lost continent that was supposed to have sunk into the Atlantic Ocean.
Cloud cuckoo land	A perfect city between the clouds in the play The Birds by Aristophanes.
Chryse and Argyre	A pair of legendary islands, located in the Indian Ocean and said to be made of gold (chrysos) and silver (argyros).
Electrides Islands	Islands in the northern Adriatic Sea across from the Po River.
Elysium (Elysian Fields)	In Greek mythology, the final resting place of the souls of the heroic and the virtuous.
Fortunate Isles (Islands of the Blessed)	Islands in the Atlantic Ocean, variously treated as a simple geographical location and as a winterless earthly paradise inhabited by the heroes of Greek mythology.
Garden of the Hesperides	The sacred garden of Hera from where the gods got their immortality.
Hyperborea	Home of the Hyperboreans in the far north of Greece or southern Europe.
Laistrygon	Home to a tribe of giant cannibals that Odysseus encountered on his way back home from the Trojan War.
Meropis	A gigantic island created purely as a parody of Plato's Atlantis.
Mount Olympus	"Olympos" was the name of the home of the Twelve Olympian gods of the ancient Greek world.
Nysa	A beautiful valley full of nymphs.
Okeanos	The cosmic river encircling the Earth in Ancient Greek cosmology, also sometimes depicted as one of the Titan gods.
Panchaia (Pangaia)	A group of islands South of the Arabian peninsula inhabited by several tribes and rich with scented oils. Assumed by some to be the birthplace of the Olympian gods.
Tartaros	A pit in the underworld for condemned souls.
Themiskyra	The capital city of the Amazons in Greek mythology.
The Underworld	Comprising the realms of The Elysium Fields, The Asphodel Meadows and Tartarus.

== Norse mythology ==
Name	Description
Alfheim	The Land of elves in Norse mythology.
Asgard	The high placed city of the gods, built by Odin, chief god of the Norse pantheon.
Biarmaland	A geographical area around the White Sea in the northern part of (European) Russia, referred to in Norse sagas.
Fositesland	The kingdom of Forseti, the god of Justice.
Gjöll	A river that separates the living from the dead in Norse mythology.
Hel (heimr)	The underworld in Norse mythology.
Hvergelmir	A major spring in Norse mythology.
Jotunheim	Land of the giants in Norse mythology.
Kvenland	A geographical area referred to in several medieval texts as well as in Norse sagas. The exact location of Kvenland is unknown, though, with several competing theories placing it in either the northern part of the Scandinavian Peninsula or the southwestern part of what is now Finland.
Mímisbrunnr	A well associated with the being Mímir, located beneath the world tree Yggdrasil.
Muspelheim	Land of fire in Norse mythology.
Niflheim	World of cold in Norse mythology.
Niflhel	Cold underworld in Norse mythology.
Norumbega	A legendary settlement in northeastern North America, connected with attempts to demonstrate Viking incursions in New England.
Svartálfaheimr	The land of the Dark Elves in Norse mythology.
Urðarbrunnr	A well in Norse mythology.
Valhalla	(from Old Norse Valhöll "hall of the slain") is a majestic, enormous hall located in Asgard, ruled over by the god Odin.
Vanaheimr	The Land of the Vanir, another tribe of gods, according to Norse legends.
Yggdrasil	An immense and central sacred tree in Norse cosmology.

== Polynesian and Māori mythology ==
Name	Description
Ao	The Polynesian realm of light.
Cape Reinga/Te Rerenga Wairua	Believed by Māori to be the place where spirits are required to journey through to reach the afterlife.
Hawaiki	A mostly universal belief among Oceanian cultures of a realm where all Polynesians descend, particularly the Māori. Not to be confused with the Islands of Hawaii.
Rarohenga	A Māori spirit world for those who favor Papatūānuku The Earth Mother.
Te Po	Polynesian realm of darkness and ancestors.
Toi O Nga Rangi	The Māori spirit world for those who favor Ranginui The Sky Father. Sometimes known as the Sky World or the Summit Of The Heavens|-

== Indian mythology ==
Name	Description
Amaravati	Capital of Svarga, the abode of the devas, ruled by Indra.
Ayotha Amirtha Gangai	An important river in Ayyavazhi mythology.
Brahmaloka	The abode of Brahma, the Hindu god of creation.
Himavanta	A legendary forest that locates at the hill of the Himalayas.
Jambudvīpa	Name for the terrestrial universe in Hindu, Buddhist, and Jain traditions.
Kailasha	The celestial abode of Shiva.
Ketumati	A pure land belonging to Maitreya within Buddhism.
Kshira Sagara	A divine ocean of milk in Hindu mythology.
Manidvipa	The abode of the supreme goddess in Hinduism.
Mayasabha	A legendary palace located in Indraprastha, as described in Mahabharata
Mount Mandara	A sacred mountain mentioned in the Puranas.
Mount Meru	The sacred five-peaked mountain of Hindu, Jain, and Buddhist cosmology. It is considered to be the center of all the physical, metaphysical, and spiritual universes.
Naraka	A realm resembling Hell in Indian religions where souls are temporarily punished before reincarnation.
Nirvana	The ultimate state of soteriological release (liberation from repeated rebirth) commonly associated with Hinduism, Jainism, and Buddhism.
Patala	The netherworld of Indian religions.
Pialral	A heaven for great achievers of the Mizo Tribes of Northeast India.
Samavasarana	Meeting place of the tirthankaras in Jainism.
Sanzu River	A mythological river in Japanese Buddhism.
Shakadvipa	A land mass west of the Ural Mountains in Hindu mythology.
Shambhala	In Tibetan Buddhist tradition, a kingdom hidden somewhere in the Himalayas; Theosophists regard it as the home on the etheric plane of the governing deity of the earth, Sanat Kumara.
Siddhashila	The place where souls who have escaped the cycle of reincarnation and attained moksha go according to the cosmology of Jainism.
Svarga	The abode of the devas in Hinduism.
Tripura	three cities or fortresses, is described in Hindu mythology as being constructed by the great Asura architect Mayasura
Thuvaraiyam Pathi	In Ayyavazhi mythology, it was a sunken island some 240 km (150 miles) off the south coast of India.
Trāyastriṃśa	An important world of the devas in the Buddhist cosmology.
Urdhvaloka	Seven upper worlds mentioned in the Puranas.
Uttarakuru	Name of a continent (dvipa) in Indian religions.
Vaikuntha	The celestial abode of Vishnu.
Vaitarani	River situated in hell mentioned in the Garuda Purana and various other Hindu religious texts.

== Chinese folk mythology ==
Name	Description
Diyu	The realm of the dead or Hell in Chinese mythology.
Eight Pillars	A concept from Chinese mythology located in the eight cardinal directions, they are a group of eight mountains or pillars which have been thought to hold up the sky.
Feather Mountain	One of many important mythological mountains in Chinese mythology, particularly associated with the Great Flood.
Fusang	A mysterious land to the east in Chinese legends.
Jade Mountain	A mythological mountain in Chinese mythology and the residence of The Queen Mother of the West.
Kunlun Mountain	A place where immortals lived according to Chinese mythology.
Longmen	A legendary waterfall in Chinese mythology.
Mount Buzhou	An ancient Chinese mythological mountain which, according to old texts, lay to the northwest of the Kunlun Mountains, in a location today referred to as the Pamir Mountains.
Mount Penglai	A legendary mountain in Chinese mythology, said to be situated on an island in the Bohai sea, home to Taoist immortals.
Moving Sands	One of the obstacles the fictional version of the monk Xuanzang and companions must cross over on their mission to fetch the Buddhist scriptures from India and return them to Tang China.
Red River	One of the mythological rivers said to flow from Kunlun, a mythological land, with mountainous features.
Shangri-La	A mystical, harmonious valley enclosed in the western end of the Kunlun Mountains, described in the 1933 novel Lost Horizon by English author James Hilton.
Weak River	One of the mythological rivers flowing near Kunlun, home of a Western Paradise.
Shangdu (Xanadu)	The summer capital of Kublai Khan's Yuan empire became a mythological place and a metaphor for splendor and opulence, popularised by the 1816 poem Kubla Khan by Samuel Taylor Coleridge.

== Abrahamic mythology ==
Name	Description
Antillia	An island from an old Iberian legend set during the Muslim conquest of Hispania. The legend says that during this time seven Christian Visigothic bishops, who were fleeing Muslim Conquerors, embarked with their flocks on ships and set sail westwards into the Atlantic Ocean, leading them to an island (Antillia or Isle Of Seven Cities) where they founded seven settlements.
As-Sirāt	The bridge which every human must pass on the Yawm al-Qiyamah ("Day of Resurrection") to enter Paradise according to Islam.
Barzakh	A place separating the living from the hereafter or a phase/"stage" between an individual's death and their resurrection in "the Hereafter".
Bethulia	A city whose deliverance by Judith, when besieged by Holofernes, forms the subject of the Book of Judith.
Brig of Dread	A bridge to Purgatory that a dead soul had to cross.
Garden of Eden	A paradise where humans were first created according to Abrahamic religions and resided until cast out for disobeying God.
Gog and Magog	Are mentioned in the Bible and the Quran both as tribes and as their land.
Heaven	In Abrahamic religions, the paradise where followers of God who have died continue to exist.
Hell	In some Abrahamic religions, a realm in the afterlife in which evil souls are punished after death.
Hitfun	A great dividing river separating the World of Darkness from the World of Light in Mandaean cosmology.
Iram of the Pillars	The lost city mentioned in the Quran.
Jabulqa and Jabulsa	Two cities mentioned in Shi'i hadith.
Kingdom of Prester John	Legendary powerful Christian nation just beyond the Muslim world in medieval romantic literature, first located in South Asia, then Central Asia, then East Africa.
Kolob	An astronomical body (star or planet) said to be near the throne of God in Mormon cosmology.
Malakut	A proposed invisible realm, featuring in Islamic cosmology.
Matarta	A "station" or "toll house" that is located between the World of Light (alma ḏ-nhūra) from Tibil (Earth) in Mandaean cosmology.
Mount of the Temptation	The legendary location of Jesus Christ's Temptation, traditionally placed at Jebel Quruntul or 'Ushsh el-Ghurab near Jericho in the West Bank
Nbu	The Mandaic name for the planet Mercury.
Pandæmonium	The capital of Hell in John Milton's Paradise Lost.
Piriawis	The sacred life-giving river (yardna) of the World of Light in Mandaean cosmology.
Pleroma	Abode of the holy aeons in Gnosticism.
Scholomance	A legendary school of black magic run by the Devil himself, located in Hermannstadt (now: Sibiu, Romania). Located in the mountains, south of the city Sibiu, near an unnamed lake.
Siniawis	A region in the World of Darkness or underworld.
Yardna	A body of flowing fresh water that is suitable for ritual use as baptismal water in Mandaeism.
Zarahemla	A civilization which was constructed in the ancient Americas, according to Mormon belief.
Zerzura	Saharan city known as the "oasis of little birds" rumored to be full of treasure.

== Celtic mythologies ==
Name	Description
Annwn	The "otherworld" of Welsh mythology.
Avalon	Legendary Island of Apples, believed by some to be the final resting place of King Arthur.
Camelot	The city in which King Arthur reigned.
Cantre'r Gwaelod	A legendary ancient sunken kingdom said to have occupied a tract of fertile land lying between Ramsey Island and Bardsey Island.
Celliwig	The earliest named location for the court of King Arthur.
Brasil or Hy-Brasil	A mythical island to the west of Ireland.
Dinas Affaraon/Ffaraon	Legendary site of King Lludd Llaw Eraint's defeat and binding of two dragons. In Lludd and Llefelys it is claimed to be the original placename of Dinas Emrys.
Emain Ablach	A mythical island paradise in Irish mythology.
Fintan's Grave	A mythological cave on the Irish mountain (now hill) Tul Tuinde
Four Treasures of the Tuatha Dé Danann (Gorias, Finias, Murias, and Falias)	In Irish Mythology the Tuatha Dé Danann get their four magical treasures from four legendary cities: Gorias in the east; Finias, in the south; Murias in the west; and Falias in the north.
Lyonesse	A country in Arthurian legend, which is said to border Cornwall in England.
Mag Mell	A mythical underworld plain in Irish mythology, achievable only through death or glory. Meaning 'plains of joy', Mag Mell was a hedonistic and pleasurable paradise, usually associated with the sea.
Rocabarraigh	A phantom island in Scottish Gaelic mythology.
Tech Duinn	A mythological island to the west of Ireland where souls go after death.
Tír fo Thuinn	A Celtic Otherworld in Irish mythology, a kingdom under the sea.
Tír na nÓg	The Celtic Otherworld in Irish mythology.
Ys	A city located in Brittany, France that was supposedly built below sea level, and demolished when the Devil destroyed the dam protecting it.

== Others ==
Name	Description
Abya Yala	"saved land", is the name used by the Guna people.
Adiri	Afterlife in Kiwai mythology.
Adlivun, Adliparmiut, and Qudlivun	Afterlives in Central Inuit mythology. Adlivun and Adliparmiut are described as lands of misery, whereas Qudlivun is a land of happiness.
Agartha	A legendary city located at the earth's core.
Akilineq	Legendary location in Inuit mythology, believed to either be entirely mythical, or possibly Labrador Peninsula, Baffin Island, or even Iceland.
Alatyr	A sacred stone, the "father to all stones", the navel of the earth, containing sacred letters and endowed with healing properties in East Slavic legends.
Alomkik	A place accessible to the Abenaki peoples' mythological protector Pamola, where he holds those who trespass on Maine's Mount Katahdin.
Altjira	A legendary era accessible during dreamtime in many Australian Aboriginal beliefs.
al-Wakwak	Island of tree growing little children.
Axis mundi	The center of the world or the connection between Heaven and Earth in various religions and mythologies.
Aztlán	Legendary original homeland of the Mexica people in Mexica/Aztec mythology.
Bald Mountain	A location in Slavic folk mythology related to witchcraft.
Baltia	An island of amber somewhere in northern Europe.
Biringan city	A mythical city that is said to invisibly lie between Gandara, Tarangnan, and Pagsanghan in Samar province of the Philippines. Biringan means "the black city" or the city of the Unknown in Waray.
Brittia	A mythical island off the coast of Austrasia.
Buyan	A mysterious island with the ability to appear and disappear using tides in Russian mythology.
Chinvat Bridge	The sifting bridge, which separates the world of the living from the world of the dead in Zoroastrianism.
City of the Caesars	A city between a mountain of gold and another of diamonds supposed to be situated in Patagonia.
Cockaigne	In medieval mythology, it is a land of plenty where want does not exist.
Domdaniel	Cavernous hall at the bottom of the ocean where evil magicians, spirits, and gnomes meet.
El Dorado	Rumored city of gold in South America.
Empire of Kitara	Legendary ancient empire in Western Region, Uganda
Fountain of Youth	A place, detailed in many legends around the world, where one may drink of or bathe in its waters to restore their youth.
Fiddler's Green	In 19th-century English maritime folklore, it was a kind of afterlife for sailors who had served at least fifty years at sea.
Great Ice Wall	A wall corresponding to Antarctica which marks the edge of the world in modern flat Earth beliefs
Hara Berezaiti	A legendary mountain around which the stars and planets revolve from the ancient Zoroastrian scriptures of the Avesta.
Hubur	A Sumerian term meaning "river", "watercourse" or "netherworld".
Irkalla	The underworld from which there is no return in Babylonian mythology.
Kalûnga Line	A watery boundary between the world of the living and the dead in religious traditions of the Congo region.
Karshvar	Legendary continents according to Avesta.
Kingdom of Opona	A mythical kingdom in Russian folklore.
Kingdom of Reynes	A country mentioned in the Middle English romance King Horn.
Kingdom of Saguenay	According to the French, an Iroquoian story of a kingdom of blonde men rich in gold and fur that existed in northern Canada prior to French colonization.
Kiringul	A cave in North Korea said to be the home of the kirin.
Kitezh	A legendary city beneath the waters of Lake Svetloyar.
Kyöpelinvuori	(Finnish for ghosts' mountain), in Finnish mythology, is the place which dead women haunt.
La Canela	Also known as the Valley of Cinnamon, is a legendary location in South America.
La Ciudad Blanca	"The White city", a legendary city of Honduras.
Lake Parime	An enormous lake in northeastern South America, supposedly the site of El Dorado.
Land of Darkness	A mythical land supposedly enshrouded in perpetual darkness.
Lemuria	A hypothetical "lost land" variously located in the Indian and Pacific Oceans.
Lintukoto	In Finnish mythology, a paradise-like place where birds migrate every winter; because it was located near the edge of the sky dome, the sky was very close to the ground and therefore its inhabitants were dwarves.
Lost City of Z	An indigenous city that Col. Percy Harrison Fawcett believed had existed in the jungle of the Mato Grosso state of Brazil.
Lukomorye	An ancient region in Russian lands.
Mahoroba	A far-off land full of bliss and peace, similar to Arcadia.
Mictlan	The afterworld of the Mexica.
Mu	A hypothetical continent that allegedly disappeared at the dawn of human history.
Nibiru	A mythological planet described by the Babylonians.
Onigashima	A mythical island of oni visited by the character Momotarō in Japanese folklore.
Ọrun	The spirit realm in Yoruba religion, inhabited by Ọlọrun, the Orisha and spirits.
Paititi	A legendary Inca lost city or utopian rich land said to lie east of the Andes.
Pohjola	The realm of Louhi in Finnish mythology, literally translated its name means "North".
Quivira and Cíbola	Two of the legendary Seven Cities of Gold supposed by Spanish conquistadors to have existed in the Americas.
Ryūgū-jō	The undersea palace of Ryūjin, the dragon kami of the sea.
Saivo	Regions of the dead in Sámi religion.
Section 37	Paul Bunyan's legendary camp. So large that it took half a day to walk around, with the kitchen itself being two-mile (3.2 km) long with nine cooks and seventy-five flunkies in its early days.
Sierra de la Plata	(Spanish: Silver Mountains), was a legendary treasury of silver that was believed to be located in South America.
Silat Bridge	The Silat Bridge is a bridge in Lalish, Iraq that leads to the most holy Yazidi shrine in Yazidism.
Suddene	A country found in the Middle English romance King Horn.
Summerland	The name given by Theosophists, Wiccans and some earth-based contemporary pagan religions to their conceptualization of an (mostly pastoral) afterlife.
Takama-ga-hara	The dwelling place of the Shinto kami.
Thule	An island somewhere in the belt of Scandinavia, northern Great Britain, Iceland, and Greenland.
Tlālōcān	A paradise ruled by the rain deity Tláloc in Aztec mythology. Afterlife of those who died by drowning, lightning, or diseases associated with the rain deity.
Tuonela	Realm of the dead in Finnish mythology.
Vineta	A mythical city at the southern coast of the Baltic Sea.
Vyraj	A mythical place in Slavic mythology, where "birds fly for the winter and souls go after death".
Westernesse	A country found in the Middle English romance King Horn.
Xibalba	The underworld in Mayan mythology.
Yomi	The land of the dead according to Shinto mythology, as related in the Kojiki.
Yomotsu Hirasaka	A slope or boundary between this world, where the living live, and the other world, where the dead live (Yomi).
Zabag	Former kingdom in Southeast Asia.

== Works cited ==
- Leech, Maria (1984). Funk & Wagnalls Standard Dictionary of Folklore, Mythology, and Legend. New York: HarperCollins. ISBN 0-308-40090-9.
