= City of the Caesars =

Mythical city in South America

The City of the Caesars (Spanish Ciudad de los Césares), also variously known as City of Patagonia, the Wandering City, Trapalanda or Trapananda, Lin Lin or Elelín, is a mythical city of South America. It was supposedly located somewhere in Patagonia, in a valley of the Andes between Chile and Argentina. Despite being searched for during the colonization of South America, no evidence proves that it ever existed, although reports of it circulated for two hundred years. In 1766 a Jesuit, Father José García Alsue, explored the area now part of Queulat National Park in Aysén Region, Chile, searching unsuccessfully for the City of the Caesars.

== Myth ==
The city is described as prosperous and rich, plenty of gold, silver and diamonds. At least one description says it was located in between two mountains, somewhere in the Andes mountains, one of gold and another of diamonds. Sometimes it is described as an enchanted city that appears in certain moments; or such that those who come upon it by chance in their travels forget the encounter; or such that hunters of it will walk away with mountains of fortune and treasure. Its purported founders include survivors of a Spanish shipwreck in the Strait of Magellan, survivors in exile of the Destruction of the Seven Cities, ghosts, Patagonian giants and survivors of the Inca Empire; indeed, one explanation of the legend is that it derived from stories told to sailors by aborigines describing the Empire of Peru.

== In popular media ==
Charles Sheffield's science fiction story "Trapalanda" (in Asimov's Science Fiction, June, 1987) is built around a quest to find Trapalanda. Pacha Pulai by Hugo Silva is a Chilean novel about a young aviator finding the City of the Caesars by accident.

== See also ==
- City of Gold (disambiguation)
- El Dorado
- Seven Cities of Gold
- Sierra de la Plata
- Tripura (mythology)
