= Kuhikugu =

Archaeological site located in the Amazon Rainforest

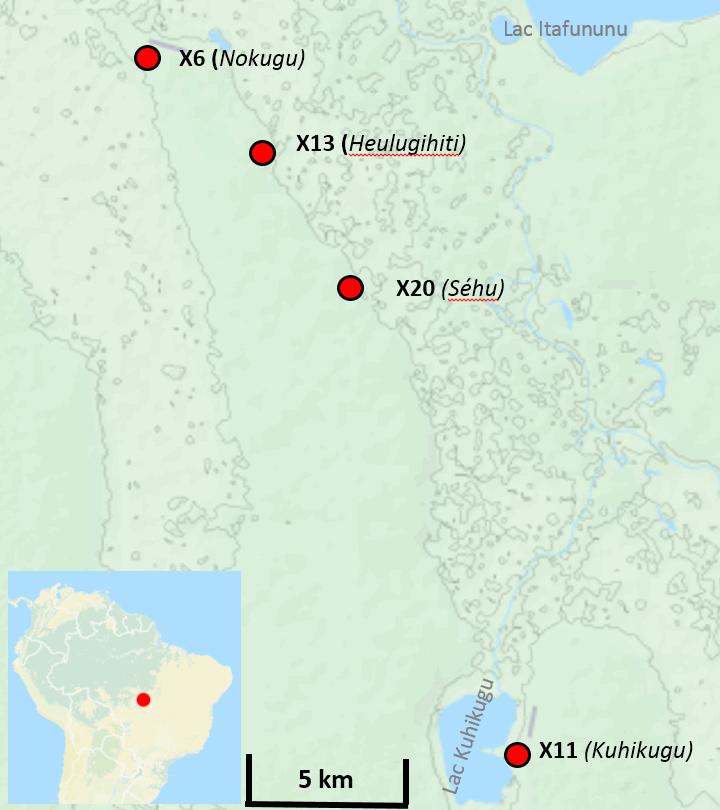
Kuhikugu map

Kuhikugu is an archaeological site located in Brazil, at the headwaters of the Xingu River, in the Amazon rainforest. The area around Kuhikugu is located in part of the Xingu National Park today. Kuhikugu was first uncovered by anthropologist Michael Heckenberger, working alongside the local Kuikuro people, who are the likely descendants of the original inhabitants of Kuhikugu.

== Archaeological complex and history ==
In the broad sense, the name refers to an archaeological complex including twenty towns and villages, spread out over an area of around 7,700 square miles (20,000 km^{2}), where close to 50,000 people may have once lived. Kuhikugu was likely inhabited from a period of time around 1,500 years ago to a time as recently as 400 years ago, when the people living there were likely killed by diseases brought over by Europeans. Although Europeans likely did not spread it to the inhabitants of Kuhikugu directly, they did directly spread diseases to trade partners from other areas. By the time Europeans did make it to this area, the civilization was already crumbling. Early conquistadors that explored this area likely saw the last moments of these towns, and their records provide insight to what these locations would have looked like. And when Europeans returned some time later the towns and villages were already consumed by the rainforest. The indigenous people now lived in tribes away from the ruins, and the memory of that civilization was remembered through oral tradition.

What sets the people that would have inhabited Kuhikugu apart from other South American civilizations are their horizontal monuments. Unlike Aztec and Maya peoples who built pyramids, these people built long monuments on the ground for their gods. Presumably this is because it would be impossible to maintain a large pyramid in a rainforest, and it would be dwarfed by the surrounding trees. The engineering was sophisticated enough for bridges that crossed large sections of river and moats for defensive purposes. Furthermore, the black earth surrounding the area indicates large scale agricultural activity

== Settlement X11 ==
Strictly speaking, Kuhikugu is settlement X11 of this complex, located near Porto dos Meinacos on the eastern shore of Lake Kuhikugu (now Lagoa Dourada) at 12°33′30″S 53°6′40″W. There, as well as at other former settlements of the Kuhikugu complex, satellite imagery reveals that even today the forest differs from surrounding pristine areas, and ground-based exploration reveals this to be an effect of the anthrosol (cf. terra preta), known to the Kuikuro as egepe. Directly to the north of the X11 site there is a Kuikuro village, the small size of which provides an interesting comparison to the large area of egepe which indicates the prehistoric settlement.

Large defensive ditches and palisades were built around some of the communities at Kuhikugu. Large plazas also exist at some of the towns throughout the region, some around 490 feet (150 m) across. Many of the communities at Kuhikugu were linked, with roads which bridged some rivers along their paths, and with canoe canals running alongside some of the roads. Sites X35 and X34 are significant communities connected by two of these roads. Site X11 has a total of 4 suburbs that connect via river or road, all of which appear to have constant relation to one another. Fields of mandioca (cassava) may have existed around the communities at Kuhikugu, suggesting that the people there were farmers. Dams and ponds which appear to have been constructed in the area also suggest that the inhabitants of Kuhikugu may have been involved with fish farming, which is still practised by some of their modern-day Kuikuro descendants.

== The Lost City of Z ==
There is a possibility that legends regarding Kuhikugu may have convinced the British explorer Lieutenant Colonel Percy Fawcett to go on his expedition for "City Z". Fawcett claimed to have discovered a large number of pottery shards in the Amazon while doing field work, and the Kuhikugu sites could have potentially had a large amount of pottery on the surface. There are over 20 sites that Kuhikugu encompasses, each of which could have supported over 5,000 people, and the sophisticated city planning and remaining structures could have been what Fawcett was looking for. Sites all follow a similar layout, meaning any of the sites could have influenced Fawcett to search for the Lost City of 'Z'.
