= Jane White =

American actress (1922–2011)

- Publicity Photo of Jane White
- Born: October 30, 1922; New York City, U.S.
- Died: July 24, 2011 (aged 88); New York City, U.S.
- Occupations: Actress and singer
- Spouse: Alfredo Viazzi (m. 1962; died 1987)
- Father: Walter Francis White

Jane White (October 30, 1922 – July 24, 2011) was an American actress and singer best known for her Broadway and off-Broadway stage performances. She won Obie Awards in 1966 for her performance in a Shakespeare in the Park productions of Love's Labour's Lost and Coriolanus and in 1971 for sustained achievement.

In 1945, she made her Broadway debut in Strange Fruit. This performance was followed by roles in Razzle Dazzle, The Insect Comedy, The Climate of Eden, Take a Giant Step, Jane Eyre, and The Power and The Glory. In 1959, she opened the acclaimed musical Once Upon a Mattress, originating the role of Queen Aggravain alongside Carol Burnett and Joseph Bova.

== Early life and education ==
White was born in New York City to Gladys Leah Powell and Walter Francis White, a civil-rights leader and national secretary of the NAACP. She grew up in the fashionable Sugar Hill neighborhood of Harlem at 409 Edgecombe Avenue. The house was nicknamed "The White House of Harlem" because of the prominent and important figures who were part of her parents' circle, such as James Weldon Johnson, Paul and Eslanda Robeson, Carl Van Vechten, and George Gershwin. She had one brother, Walter Carl Darrow White.

White attended Smith College beginning in the early 1940s; she majored in sociology so she might follow her father into social activism, but she maintained a stronger passion for the arts. She minored in music, studying classical voice with Anna Hamlin, and participated in extracurricular dance and fencing. In 1943, she also served as president of the student house of representatives, making her the first black student elected to serve in a government position at Smith.

At the beginning of her freshman year, a fellow resident in White's dormitory, who was white, told the college leadership that she refused to share a dormitory with a woman of color and would leave the school unless White were forced to leave. The college rejected the ultimatum; the student elected to stay.

== Career ==
=== Early career ===
White worked for a short time as a proofreader for the Research Institute of America while also attending beginners' acting classes at New York's New School.

In 1945, White secured her first part playing the lead role of "Nonnie" in the Broadway production of Strange Fruit. The play was an adaptation of the controversial novel about interracial love in the South. She was originally recommended for the part by Paul Robeson, a friend of the White family. The play opened to mixed reviews, but both White and the play received positive attention from Eleanor Roosevelt, then First Lady, who wrote her own review in her column My Day. Of White's performance, Roosevelt wrote: I should like to pay tribute to the cast of this play as a whole, but particularly to Jane White whose first venture this is on the stage and who plays her part with restraint and beauty.

White made her TV debut as a dramatic actress on June 14, 1950, in "You Have Been Warned", an episode of Stage 13 on CBS.

In 1959, White played the role of the scheming Queen Aggravain in Once Upon a Mattress, in which Carol Burnett made her Broadway debut.

In 1965, White and her husband, restaurateur Alfredo Viazzi, left New York for Italy, returning three years later.

=== 1970s–2011 ===
White continued to work steadily in theatre and occasionally in television and movies from the 1970s through the 2000s. Her theatrical work has spanned summer stock, off-Broadway and on-Broadway shows. Much of her work was in classical dramas, with particular focus on Shakespeare; she won an Obie Award for her roles in the 1965–66 New York Shakespeare Festival as Volumnia in Coriolanus and the Princess of France in Love's Labour's Lost.

In the late 1970s, White and her husband opened Alfredo's Settebello in the Village, and White performed there as a cabaret singer.

She won the 1988–89 Los Angeles Critics Circle Award for her role as the Mother in Federico Garcia Lorca's Blood Wedding. She also played roles in such dramas as Euripides' Iphigenia at Aulis and Henrik Ibsen's Ghosts; comedies such as Paul Rudnick's I Hate Hamlet; and musicals such as Stephen Sondheim's A Little Night Music and the 2001 production of Sondheim's Follies, to name a small selection.

In addition to the productions of Once Upon a Mattress, her television work included a 1979 stint on the soap operas The Edge of Night, A World Apart, and Search for Tomorrow. She was one of the first African-American actresses to play a role under contract on soap operas when she originated the role of Lyndia Holliday, R.N., on The Edge of Night. In 1998, she played the schoolteacher Lady Jones in the movie version of Toni Morrison's Beloved. From 1979 to 1980, White starred in a self-written, one-woman cabaret show entitled Jane White, Who?, which interspersed autobiographical anecdotes and personal reminiscence with songs. As late as 2006, she continued to perform occasionally in cabaret theater.

== Personal life ==
In 1962, White met the New York restaurateur Alfredo Viazzi, and after a short courtship they were wed. They moved to Italy in 1965, but moved back to the U.S. in the late 1960s. Viazzi died of a heart attack on December 28, 1987, aged 66.

White donated her papers to the Sophia Smith Collection at Smith College in 1989 and continued to send additions until her death in 2011.

== Death ==
White died on July 24, 2011, in New York City, aged 88, of cancer.

== Work ==
=== Film ===
Year	Title	Role	Notes
1971	Klute	Janie Dale	
1998	Beloved	Lady Jones	(final film role)

=== Stage ===
Year	Title	Role	Notes
1945	Strange Fruit	Nonnie Anderson	
1948	The Insect Comedy	Young Butterfly, 1st Moth	
1951	Razzle Dazzle		
1952	The Climate of Eden	Ellen	
1953	Take a Giant Step	Carol	
1958	Jane Eyre	Bertha	
1958	The Power and the Glory	Obregon's Wife	
1959	Once Upon a Mattress	The Queen Aggravain	
1968	The Cuban Thing	Barbara	
2001	Follies	Solange LaFitte	
2008	Cat on a Hot Tin Roof	Big Mama	as understudy

=== Television ===
Year	Title	Role	Notes
1950	Stage 13		Episode: "You've Been Warned"
1951– 1952	Crime Photographer		Episode: "Brains" Episode: "The Long Fall"
1956	The Alcoa Hour	Dolores Infante	Episode: "Tragedy in a Temporary Town"
1957	Studio One in Hollywood	Dr. Caltvalko	Episode: "The Goodwill Ambassadors"
1957	Kraft Theatre	Maria	Episode: "Welcome to a Stranger"
1961	Car 54, Where Are You?	Katharine (show within a show excerpt of The Taming of the Shrew)	Episode: "The Taming of Lucille"
1964	Once Upon A Mattress	Queen Aggravain	Television film
1968	NET Playhouse	Reverend Mary Alexander	Episode: "Trumpets of the Lord"
1969	The Edge of Night	Lydia Holliday	6 episodes
1972	Once Upon a Mattress	Queen Aggravain	Television film
1979	Search for Tomorrow	Tante Helene LeVeaux	
1983	Great Performances at the Met	Andromache	Episode: "Les Troyens"
1987	Everything's Relative	Madame Estelle	Episode: "Hit the Road, Jack"
1989– 1990	Amen	Josephine Gregory	4 episodes
1991	Law & Order	Appellate Judge A. Green	Episode: Asylum

== Awards ==
White won the 1965–66 Obie award for her performances in the New York Shakespeare Festival as the Princess of France in Love's Labor's Lost and Volumnia in Coriolanus, and the 1988-89 Los Angeles Critics Circle Award for the Mother in Lorca's Blood Wedding.
