= Azarin =

Azarin (Russian: Азарин; masculine) or Azarina (Азарина; feminine) is a Russian surname. Notable people with the surname include:

- Aleksandr Azarin (1919–2004), master of artistic reading, People's Artist of Russia
- Azary Azarin (1897—1937), Soviet actor, brother of Rachel Messerer, Russian silent movie and theater actress
- Iraj Azarin, one of the four signatories of the declaration founding the Worker-communist Party of Iran
- Soussan Azarin, actor playing in the 2008 movie For a Moment, Freedom

== Fictional characters ==
- Anastas Azarin, Soviet interrogator from the 1958 American sci-fi novel Who?
