= The Internecine Project =

- Film Poster
- Directed by: Ken Hughes
- Written by: Barry Levinson; Jonathan Lynn
- Based on: novel Internecine by Mort W. Elkind
- Produced by: Barry Levinson co producer Andrew Donally
- Starring: James Coburn; Lee Grant; Harry Andrews; Ian Hendry; Michael Jayston
- Cinematography: Geoffrey Unsworth
- Edited by: John Shirley
- Music by: Roy Budd
- Production companies: MacLean and Co; Hemisphere Productions; Lion International
- Distributed by: British Lion Films
- Release date: 19 September 1974 (London)
- Running time: 89 minutes
- Country: United Kingdom
- Language: English

The Internecine Project is a 1974 British espionage thriller film directed by Ken Hughes and starring James Coburn and Lee Grant. It was written by Barry Levinson and Jonathan Lynn based on the novel Internecine by Mort W. Elkind.

== Plot ==
Renowned American economist Robert Elliot who is about to be promoted to be a government adviser has also been secretly running a business espionage ring in London with the help of four operatives: corrupt Foreign Office official Alex Hellman, masseur Bert Parsons, sex worker Christina Larsson and scientist David Baker. He is advised to have his operatives killed by E.J. Farnsworth, a businessman who has helped secure Elliot's appointment to prevent them from exposing Elliot's dubious activities. To avoid himself or anyone on the outside being implicated, Elliot devises and carries out a clever plan in which his four former associates will unwittingly kill each other on the same night. He visits each of his associates in turn and convinces each of them that their intended target is about to expose their activities and that they must be killed to ensure their silence.

On the night the murders have been planned for, Elliot keeps track of his operatives' progress by listening for a series of telephone rings that indicate each associate's current location. David leaves for Alex's apartment where he replaces the diabetic Alex's regular insulin supply with a stronger, lethal dose. Despite being delayed in leaving Alex's apartment, he returns home in time to be killed by his own sonic weapon which he had earlier demonstrated to Elliot and which has been planted by Christine on a timer. Christine returns home and Bert enters her apartment with a key given to him by Elliot, and proceeds to strangle Christine to death while she's taking a shower, before placing a fragment of skin Elliot had earlier removed from a corpse under the lifeless Christine's fingernails in order to confuse police pathologists. Alex retrieves a number of items from a locker at London Marylebone station, including a hammer and waits outside the massage parlour Bert works at for his target to arrive. Alex calls Elliot and tells him he can't go through with killing Bert, but Elliot threatens him and Alex reluctantly agrees to continue his mission. He lies in wait for Bert in a back passage and strikes Bert dead with the hammer. A panicked Alex returns home without ringing Elliot to communicate that he's killed Bert and Elliot eventually travels to meet Alex at his home. After confirming to Elliot that he has killed Bert, Alex dies in front of Elliot from the lethal insulin dose planted by David that he has taken.

The next day, before leaving to take up his new job in Washington, D.C., Elliot receives a package by special delivery. While he is being driven to the airport, he opens the package, which contains a notebook with a message written by David. It states that David never really trusted Elliot and in the event of his death would assume that Elliot was responsible, before revealing that the pages of the notebook are saturated in a deadly poison that is absorbed through the skin, which will kill Elliot within 5 minutes. Elliot arrives at the airport dead.

== Cast ==
- James Coburn as Robert Elliot
- Lee Grant as Jean Robertson
- Harry Andrews as Albert Parsons
- Ian Hendry as Alex Hellman
- Michael Jayston as David Baker
- Christiane Krüger as Christina Larsson
- Keenan Wynn as E.J. Farnsworth
- Terence Alexander as business tycoon
- Philip Anthony as Eliott's secretary
- Julian Glover as Arnold Pryce-Jones
- Mary Larkin as Jean's secretary

== Production ==
The film was made by British Lion Films, then run by Michael Deeley and Barry Spikings. Deeley wrote in his memoirs that it and another movie, Who? were financed the same way: half the costs coming from a US deal with Allied Artists, the other half coming from a German tax shelter deal. "In terms of cinema history, neither film is important," wrote Deeley, but he took pride in how they were financed saying "such clever means were the only way to keep British Lion alive."

In her memoirs, Lee Grant called it "a really flimsy film" where "the script was no more than a sixteen page outline, but the money was good and my co star was James Coburn, an actor I admired and wanted to play with."

During filming Grant admitted the film "is a switch for me." She said she did it because she and her husband were about to adopt two children and also because "I thought the picture would be a really great party – a come-as-you-are party because I don't have to put fake wrinkles on as I normally do. My only regret is that I'm breaking my image playing a sexy lady."

== Reception ==
The Monthly Film Bulletin wrote: "If the characters in The Internecine Project have about as much individual interest as pawns pushed round a chessboard, this is – paradoxically – a measure of just where the film's major strength is to be found: for once the overall design is so ingenious anyway, so pleasing in itself, that it renders the paucity of characterisation and the banality of dialogue almost immaterial. ...Belonging to that lineage of such films as A Dandy in Aspic, The Ipcress File, Get Carter – The Internecine Project predictably proves no masterpiece but is pleasantly entertaining throughout."

Variety wrote: "Beautifully photographed in soft tones by master British cameraman Geoffrey Unsworth, Internecine has a slick and handsome gloss worthy of a much more expensive project. His mastery of London during an off-season, rather drab period is one of the film's major assets."

The Los Angeles Times called it "sardonic and interesting".

Filmink argued the movie needed extra twists and called it "a great idea shoddily done."

TV Guide wrote: "Although it has a nice thriller plot line, The Internecine Project, like the plan, is less than perfect in execution".
