= Francisco de Orellana =

Spanish explorer and conquistador (1511–1546)

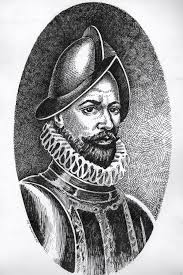
- Portrait of Francisco de Orellana
- Born: 1511; Trujillo, Crown of Castile
- Died: November 1546 (aged 34–35); Amazon Delta (today Pará and Amapá, Brazil)
- Occupation: Conquistador
- Employer: Charles V, Holy Roman Emperor
- Known for: First known European navigation through the length of the Amazon River
- Spouse: Ana de Ayala

Francisco de Orellana (Spanish pronunciation: [fɾanˈθisko ðe oɾeˈʎana]; 1511 – November 1546) was a Spanish explorer and conquistador significant to the Spanish exploration and conquests in South America. In one of the most improbably successful voyages in known history, Orellana managed to sail the length of the Amazon, arriving at the river's mouth on 24 August 1542. He and his party sailed along the Atlantic coast until reaching Cubagua Island, near the coast of Venezuela.

Orellana founded the city of Guayaquil in what is now Ecuador, and died during a second expedition on the Amazon.

== Background ==
Born in Trujillo in western Spain (various birth dates, ranging from 1490 to 1511, are still quoted by biographers), Orellana was a close friend and possibly a relative (a cousin, according to some historians) of Francisco Pizarro, the Trujillo-born conquistador of Peru. He traveled to the New World (probably in 1527). Orellana served in Nicaragua until joining Pizarro's army in Peru in 1533 during the Conquest of the Inca Empire, where he supported Pizarro in his conflict with Diego de Almagro (1538). After the victory over De Almagro's men, he was appointed governor of La Culata. He re-established the town of Guayaquil, previously founded by Pizarro and repopulated by Sebastián de Belalcázar. During the civil war, he sided with the Pizarros and was Ensign General of a force sent by Francisco Pizarro from Lima to aid Hernando Pizarro. He was granted land at Puerto Viejo, on the coast of Ecuador.

== First exploration of the Amazon River ==
Route of first voyage (1541–1542)

In 1540 Gonzalo Pizarro arrived in Quito as vice governor and was charged by Francisco Pizarro, his older paternal half-brother, with an expedition to locate the "Land of Cinnamon", thought to be somewhere to the east. Orellana was one of Gonzalo Pizarro's lieutenants during his 1541 expedition east of Quito into the South American interior. In Quito, Gonzalo Pizarro collected a force of 220 Spaniards and 4000 natives. At the same time, as second in command, Orellana was sent back to Guayaquil to gather troops and horses. Pizarro left Quito in February 1541, just before Orellana arrived with his 23 men and horses. Orellana hurried after the main expedition, eventually contacting them in March. However, by the time the expedition had left the mountains, 3000 natives and 140 Spanish had died or deserted.

On reaching the Coca River (a tributary of the Napo), a brigantine, the San Pedro, was constructed to ferry the sick and supplies. Gonzalo Pizarro ordered him to explore the Coca and return after finding the river's end. When they arrived at the confluence with the Napo River, his men threatened to mutiny if they did not continue. On 26 December 1541, he agreed to be elected chief of the new expedition and conquer new lands in the king's name. Orellana (with the Dominican Gaspar de Carvajal who chronicled the expedition) and 50 men set off downstream to find food. Unable to return against the current, Orellana waited for Pizarro, finally sending back three men with a message, and started constructing a second brigantine, the Victoria. Pizarro had in the meantime returned to Quito by a more northerly route, by then with only 80 men left alive.

After leaving the village on the Napo, Orellana continued downstream to the Amazon. The 49 men began to build a bigger ship for river navigation. During their navigation on Napo River, they were threatened constantly by the Omaguas. They reached the Negro River on 3 June 1542 and finally arrived on the Amazon River.

At a longitude of about 69°W, Orellana and his men were involved in a skirmish with Machiparo's natives and were chased downstream. Continuing downstream, they consecutively passed the Rio de la Trinidad (possibly the Rio Juruá), the Pueblo Vicioso, the Rio Negro (named by Orellana), the Pueblo del Corpus, the Pueblo de los Quemados, and the Pueblo de la Calle at about 57°W. There they entered the territory of the Pira-tapuya.

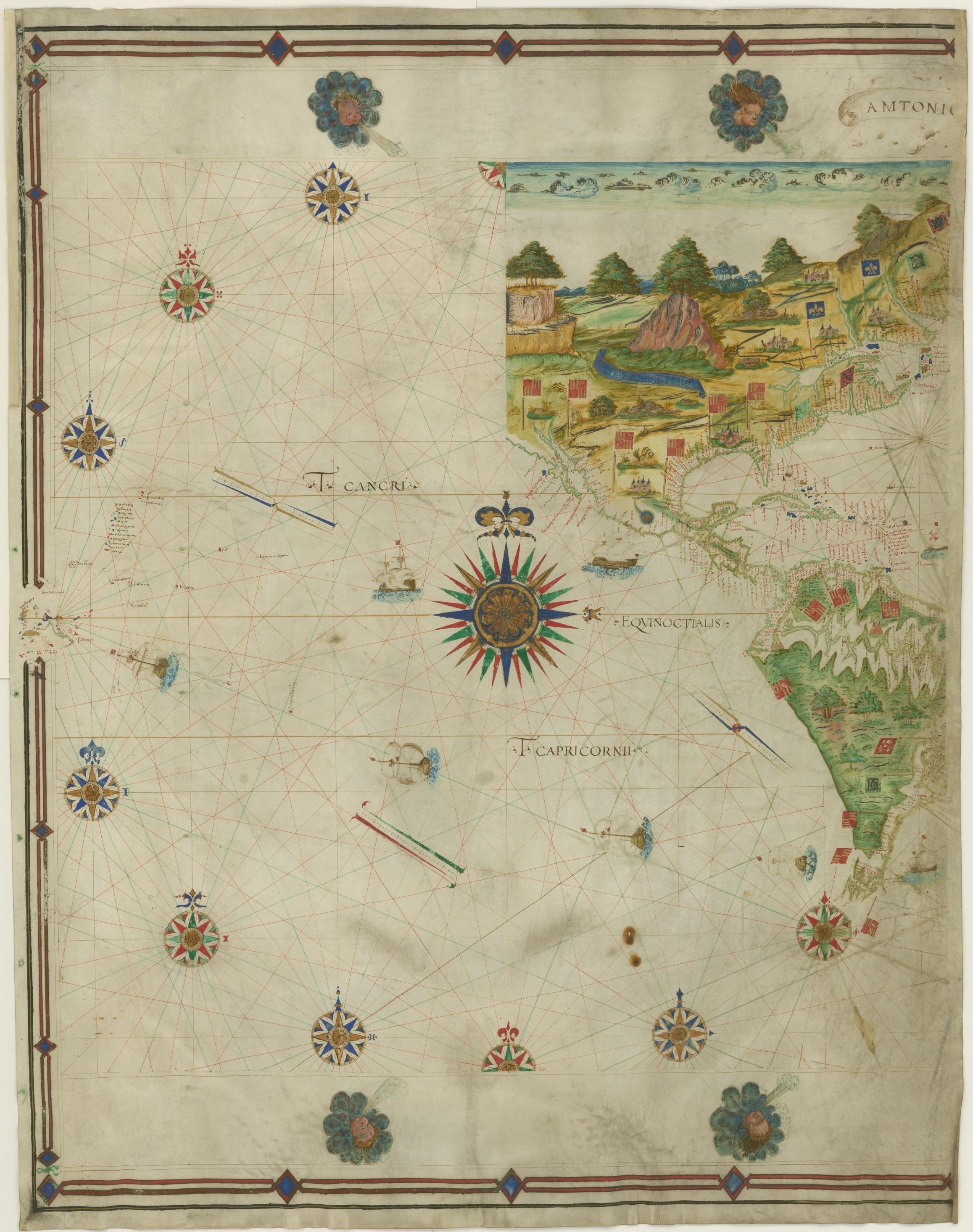
Manuscript map of Francisco de Orellana's expedition of 1539 to 1542, attributed to António Pereira, a Portuguese seaman

The name 'Amazon' is said to arise from a battle Francisco de Orellana fought with a tribe of Tapuyas. The women of the tribe fought alongside the men, as was the custom among the tribe. Orellana described the river as "the river of the Amazons", referring to the mythical Amazons of Asia described by Herodotus (see The Histories [4.110–116]) and Diodorus in Greek legends. A skirmish with these South American warrior women reportedly took place on 24 June 1542 while Orellana was approaching the Trombetas River, in the neighborhood of the Ilha Tupinambarama at the junction with the River Madeira.

At about 54°W they stopped for 18 days to repair the boats, and finally reached the Atlantic Ocean on 26 August 1542, and checked the boats for seaworthiness. While coasting toward Guiana, the brigs were separated until reunited at Nueva Cadiz on Cubagua island off the coast of Venezuela. The Victoria, carrying Orellana and Carvajal, passed south around Trinidad and was trapped in the Gulf of Paria for seven days, finally reaching Cubagua on 11 September 1542. The San Pedro sailed north of Trinidad and reached Cubagua on 9 September.

== Second expedition and death ==
=== Preparations ===
From Cubagua, Orellana decided to return to Spain to obtain from the Crown the governorship over the discovered lands, which he named New Andalusia. After a difficult navigation, he touched first the shores of Portugal. The king received him in a friendly way and made him an offer to go back to the Amazon under a Portuguese flag. Orellana's exploration produced an international issue. According to the Treaty of Tordesillas, the majority of the Amazon River should belong to Spain. However, the mouth should be ruled by Portugal. Orellana refused the Portuguese offer and went to Valladolid.

After nine months of negotiations, Prince Philip II appointed him governor of New Andalusia on February 13, 1544. After captivating the Spanish court with tales and alleged exaggerations of his voyage down the Amazon, Orellana obtained a commission to conquer and settle Nueva Andalucia. The charter established that he should explore and settle the Amazonian lands with 300 men and 100 horses, and found two cities, one in the mouth and another in the basin's interior.

The commission was accepted on 18 February 1544. However, preparations for the voyage were frustrated by unpaid debts, Portuguese spies, and internal wranglings. Sufficient funds were raised through the efforts of Cosmo de Chaves, Orellana's stepfather. However, the problems were compounded by Orellana's decision to marry a very young and poor girl, Ana de Ayala, whom he intended to take with him (along with her sisters). Orellana's creditors relented and allowed him to sail only on the arrival of a Portuguese spy fleet at Seville. On reaching Sanlucar he was detained again, the authorities having discovered a shortfall in his complement of men and horses, and that large numbers of his crew were not Spanish. On 11 May 1545, Orellana (in hiding on one of his vessels) surreptitiously sailed out of Sanlucar with four ships and disappeared from view.

=== Expedition ===
On 11 May 1545, he left Spain with four ships, supplies to build two riverboats, perhaps 300 men, at least 24 horses, and his young wife. Before leaving land, he obtained from a farm some cattle, pigs, and chickens, which he salted. In the open sea, he waylaid a caravel and looted its supplies. At the end of May, he reached Tenerife and spent three months there putting his ships in order. He then sailed to the Cape Verde Islands where an epidemic killed 98 of his men and 50 or 60 deserted. With this loss, he abandoned one of his ships after salvaging what he could. He left about the middle of November. The crossing was difficult, and one of his ships became separated and was never seen again. With it went 77 men, 11 horses, and supplies to build one riverboat. He lost several anchors and had to replace them with cannons.

He reached the Brazil coast, sailed a hundred leagues until he found fresh water in the sea, which he assumed came from the Amazon. He landed on 20 December 1545 with two ships, 11 thin horses, and perhaps 100 men. Since the natives were friendly and there was plenty of food, his men suggested that they stop and rest and build the riverboat. Orellana overruled them and set off to find the main branch of the Amazon five days later. After sailing more than 300 miles he made camp and started building the riverboat. This took from January to March. They were forced to cannibalize the smaller of the two ships. The natives were hostile, there was little food in the area, and they had to eat all their dogs and horses. Fifty-seven men died.

Orellana sent the newly built boat off to find food, but it returned with no food and several men dead of hunger or wounds. He set off with the remaining ship and the riverboat. After traveling 75 miles southeast, the ship was wrecked on a riverbank. Orellana continued with the boat, leaving many men at the shipwreck camp. After nearly a month, he returned to the shipwreck, reporting that he had gone 500 miles and not found the main river. Orellana was now in poor shape, both physically and mentally. He set off again with the boat. Seventeen of his men were wounded by arrows. According to his wife, he died "from illness and grief." The survivors went downriver to the sea where they were driven by the South Equatorial Current to the Spanish base at Margarita Island west of Trinidad.

After Orellana left the shipwreck camp, the 28 or 30 men there began building a boat from the wrecked ship, which took more than three months. The boat was ill-built and leaky. Some indigenous people guided them to "a place where the Amazon splits into three arms". Finding no sign of Orellana, they went downriver. Ten men jumped ship, preferring life with the natives to a leaking boat. Reaching the sea, the current carried them northwest. In late November, the 18 survivors reached Margarita Island, where they met the other 25 survivors and Orellana's wife.

== Places named after Orellana ==
- Puerto Francisco de Orellana, Ecuador
- Orellana Province, Ecuador
- Francisco de Orellana, Maynas, Loreto, Peru
- The Amazon River was once called the Orellana River

== Historical chronicles ==
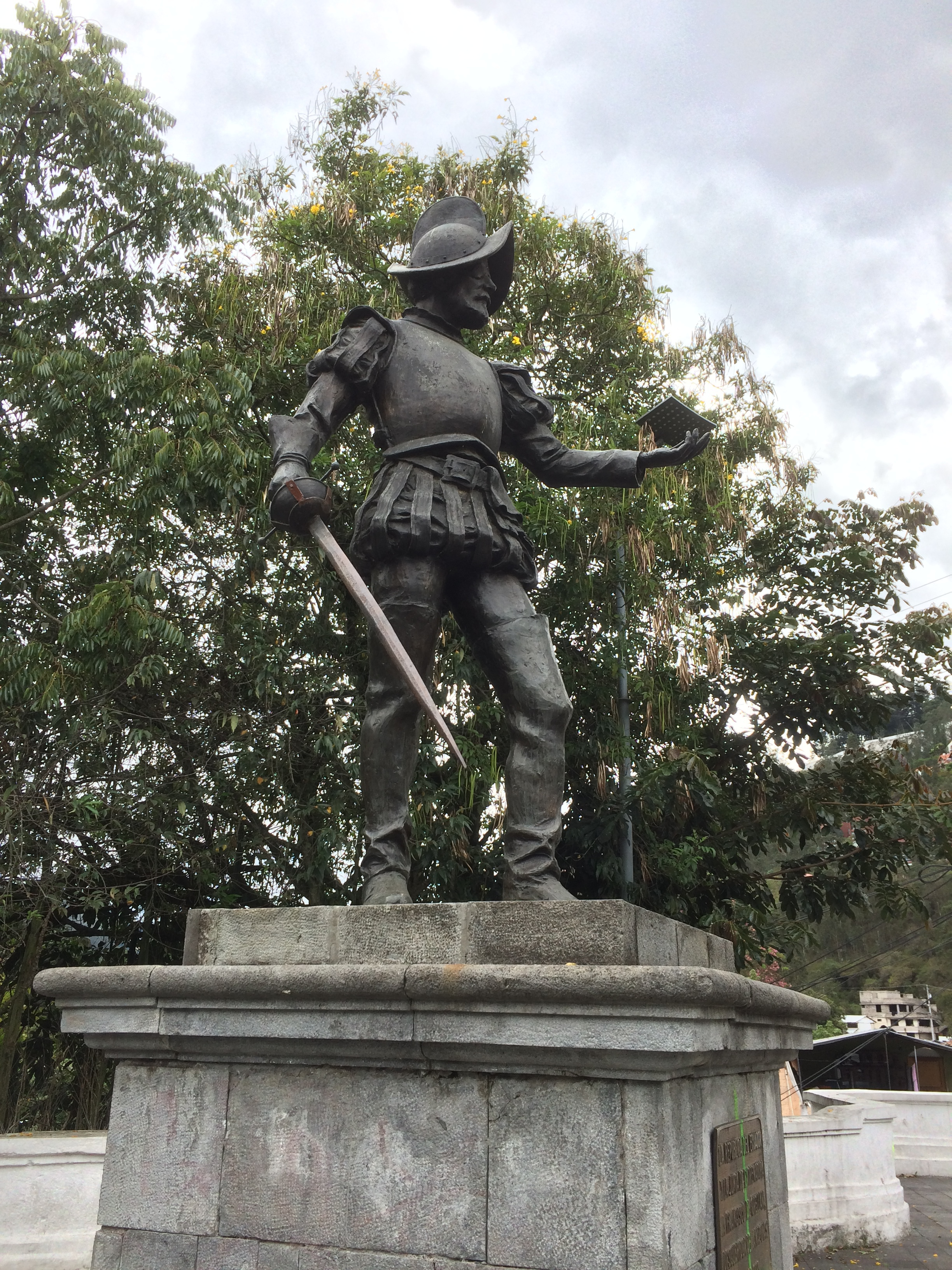
Francisco de Orellana Monument at Guápulo, point of departure to the Amazon (from Quito)

Gaspar de Carvajal, the chaplain of the first expedition, wrote a chronicle Relación del nuevo descubrimiento del famoso río Grande que descubrió por muy gran ventura el capitán Francisco de Orellana (Chronicle of the new discovery of the famous Great river discovered by great good fortune by Captain Francisco de Orellana) which was partly reproduced in Gonzalo Fernández de Oviedo y Valdés's Historia general y natural de las Indias, initially published in 1526 but continually revised until the author's death in 1557, who included in addition statements by Orellana and some of his men. Carvajal's manuscript was published in 1894 by the Chilean historian José Toribio Medina, preceded by a biography of Carvajal, in his book Descubrimiento del río de las Amazonas.

The BBC documentary Unnatural Histories presents evidence that Carvajal's chronicle, rather than being a hugely exaggerated fantasy as previously thought, was correct in its observations that a civilization was flourishing along the Amazon in the 1540s. It is believed that the civilization was later devastated by the spread of smallpox and other diseases from Europe. The evidence to support this claim comes from the discovery of numerous geoglyphs dating from between 1 and 1250 AD, and terra preta resulting from indigenous activities. Some five million people may have lived in the Amazon region in 1500 in dense riverbank settlements such as that at Marajó, and inland. By 1900 the population had fallen to one million, and by the early 1980s it was fewer than 200,000.

== In popular culture ==
A modern retelling of Orellana and his crew's epic journey, with source material primarily provided by Carvajal, is written in Buddy Levy's River of Darkness.

De Orellana's voyages served as partial inspiration for the film Aguirre, the Wrath of God (1972). An earlier script, penned by director Werner Herzog, also deliberately included De Orellana in the movie, but he was ultimately left out.

De Orellana's role in the search for El Dorado also forms part of the plot of the film Indiana Jones and the Kingdom of the Crystal Skull (2008).

William Ospina's 2008 novel El país de la canela (The Cinnamon Country) includes a novelized version of Orellana's trip.

One of the campaigns of Age of Empires II: The Forgotten is called El Dorado and is about the quest of Francisco de Orellana and Francisco Pizarro to find El Dorado, the legendary Lost City of Gold, thought to be hidden somewhere in the vast Amazon rainforest. The campaign is based on De Orellana's first exploration.

Orellana appears as a potential unit for the Spanish Empire in Civilization VII. He appears as a conquistador during the exploration era.

== See also ==
- Pedro Teixeira
