= Once Upon a Mattress =

1959 American musical comedy

- Original cast recording
- Music: Mary Rodgers
- Lyrics: Marshall Barer
- Book: Jay Thompson; Marshall Barer; Dean Fuller; Amy Sherman-Palladino (2024 production)
- Basis: Fairy tale The Princess and the Pea
- Productions: 1958 Camp Tamiment, PA; 1959 Off-Broadway; 1959 Broadway; 1960 US Tour; 1960 West End; 1964 U.S. Television; 1972 U.S. Television; 1996 Broadway revival 2005 U.S. Television; 2024 Encores! 2024 Broadway revival 2024 Los Angeles

Once Upon a Mattress is a musical comedy with music by Mary Rodgers, lyrics by Marshall Barer, and book by Jay Thompson, Dean Fuller, and Barer. It opened off-Broadway in May 1959, and then moved to Broadway. The play was written as a humorous adaptation of the 1835 Hans Christian Andersen fairy tale "The Princess and the Pea".

Once Upon a Mattress was written as a shorter play at the Tamiment adult summer camp resort. The play was later expanded for the Broadway stage. Initial reviews of the play were mixed, but critics and actors alike were surprised by the show's enduring popularity, as Once Upon a Mattress became a popular choice for high school and university music and drama programs.

== Production history ==
=== Broadway (1959-1960) ===
The original production opened on May 11, 1959, at the off-Broadway Phoenix Theatre (later a multi-plex cinema on the Lower East Side), transferred later that year to Broadway at the Alvin Theatre (the modern Neil Simon Theatre) and then to several other Broadway theaters, finally playing at the St. James Theatre, for a total run of 470 performances. The musical was directed by George Abbott and choreographed by Joe Layton. Once Upon a Mattress marked the Broadway debut of comedian Carol Burnett, who originated the role of Princess Winnifred. Also featured were Joseph Bova, Allen Case, Jack Gilford and Matt Mattox. Jane White played the role of Queen Aggravain. Jack Gilford played King Sextimus The Silent and was later replaced by Will Lee, Gilford's standby, before the show's Broadway move. The musical received a Tony Award nomination for Best Musical as well as a Best Leading Actress nomination for Carol Burnett. When Burnett left the show on June 25, 1960, veteran television actress Ann B. Davis took over the leading role beginning June 27. A few days later the show announced it was closing July 2; Davis played eight performances as Winnifred.

=== US National Tour (1960) ===
In August 1960, soon after the closing of the Broadway run, rehearsals were called for a seven-month US tour which would move from city to city by train, truck and bus. Jack Sydow stepped from his role as King into the position of Director. Dody Goodman played Winnifred at first, then Imogene Coca picked up the role. Carol Arthur understudied them both, and played the Nightingale of Samarkand. Fritzi Burr played the Queen and Buster Keaton played the King. Keaton's wife Eleanor was placed in the chorus. Keaton warmed up to the cast of younger actors, freely dispensing grandfatherly advice and chocolates.

=== West End (1960) ===
A London production of the musical opened at the Adelphi Theatre on September 20, 1960, where it ran for 24 performances. The cast included Jane Connell as Winnifred, Robin Hunter as Dauntless, Milo O'Shea as the King, Bill Kerr as the Wizard, Bill Hayes as the Minstrel, and Max Wall as the Jester. EMI Records took the cast into the recording studio and recorded a London Cast album. This was issued as a His Master's Voice LP. The album was included on a CD titled Once Upon a Mattress issued by Sepia Records in 2010.

=== Subsequent revivals ===
A Broadway revival opened on December 19, 1996, at the Broadhurst Theatre and closed on May 31, 1997, after 35 previews and 188 regular performances. It starred Sarah Jessica Parker as Princess Winnifred, Mary Lou Rosa as Queen Aggravain, David Aaron Baker as Dauntless, Lewis Cleale as Sir Harry, Heath Lamberts as the King, Lawrence Clayton as the Minstrel, David Hibbard as the Jester, Tom Alan Robbins as Master Merton and Jane Krakowski as Lady Larken. The production was nominated for the 1997 Tony Award for Best Revival of a Musical.

The musical opened Off-Broadway, produced by the Transport Group, at the Abrons Arts Center on December 13, 2015, for a limited run which ended on January 3, 2016. Directed by Jack Cummings III, the cast featured Jackie Hoffman as Princess Winnifred, John Epperson as Queen Aggravain, Jessica Fontana as Lady Larken, David Greenspan as The King, and Hunter Ryan Herdlicka as The Minstrel.

From January 24 until February 4, 2024, a concert production was staged as part of the New York City Center Encores! series. The production had a book adaptation by Amy Sherman-Palladino and direction by Lear deBessonet. Among the cast were Sutton Foster as Princess Winnifred, Michael Urie as Dauntless, Nikki Renée Daniels as Lady Larken, Cheyenne Jackson as Sir Harry, Harriet Sansom Harris as the Queen, David Patrick Kelly as the King, Francis Jue as the Wizard, and J. Harrison Ghee as the Jester. This production cut the role of the Minstrel as well as the song "The Minstrel, the Jester, and I", and made the Jester non-binary using they/them pronouns, with an implied romance between the Jester and the Wizard.

In May 2024, it was announced that the production would transfer to Broadway in summer 2024. The show began previews on July 31 at the Hudson Theatre with an opening night on August 12. Foster and Urie reprised their respective roles of Winnifred and Dauntless and Daniels and Kelly reprised their respective roles of Lady Larken and the King. New to the cast were Brooks Ashmanskas as the Wizard, Daniel Breaker as the Jester, Will Chase as Sir Harry, and Ana Gasteyer as Queen Aggravain. The show ran through November 30 and then transferred to the Ahmanson Theatre in Los Angeles for a four-week engagement lasting from December 10, 2024 to January 5, 2025 with Ben Davis and Kevin Del Aguila joining the cast as Sir Harry and the Wizard. On Broadway, the production received mostly positive reviews with The New York Times giving the production a Critic's Pick and praising both Foster and Urie in their roles while others including Variety noted that Foster was overall awkward in the role. A cast recording of the musical was released on March 28, 2025.

== Television adaptations ==
=== 1964 ===
The first television adaptation was aired on June 3, 1964, on CBS. The production was videotaped in black and white in front of a live audience and featured Burnett, Bova, Gilford, and White from the original Broadway cast, as well as new principals Bill Hayes as the Minstrel, Shani Wallis as Lady Larken and Elliott Gould (in his first appearance on any screen) as the Jester. Due to the reduced running time of 90 minutes, several songs and scenes were either cut or shortened. The character of Sir Harry was written out, and the Minstrel was rewritten to be Lady Larken's love interest, with the conflict concerning them being downplayed to a secret marriage.

=== 1972 ===
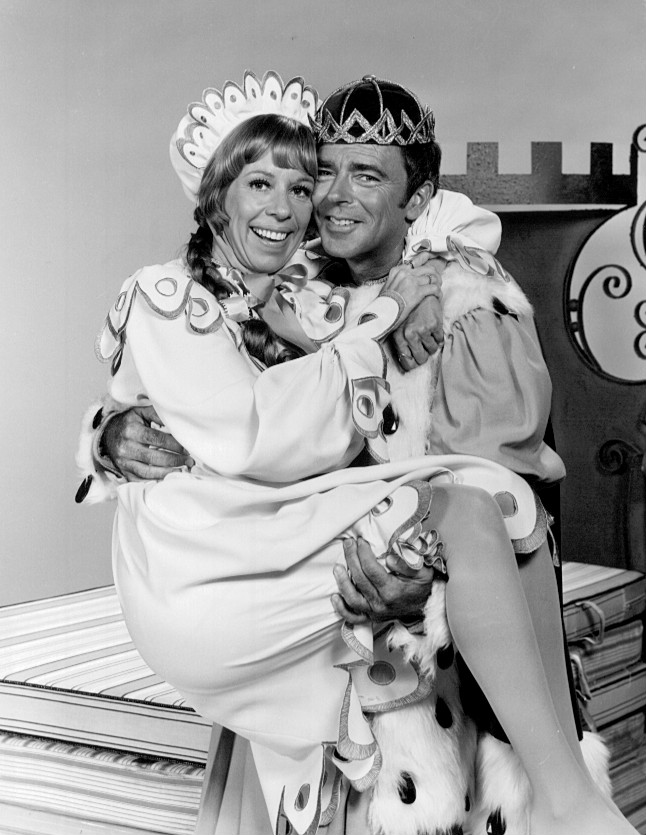
Carol Burnett and Ken Berry in the 1972 television production.

The second television adaptation was broadcast on December 12, 1972, on CBS. This production, videotaped in color, included original Broadway cast members Burnett, Gilford and White, and also featured Bernadette Peters as Lady Larken, Ken Berry as Prince Dauntless, Ron Husmann as Sir Harry, Wally Cox as The Jester, and Lyle Waggoner as Sir Studley. It was directed by Ron Field and Dave Powers. Again, several songs were eliminated and characters were combined or altered. Since the parts of the Minstrel and the Wizard were cut from this adaptation, a new prologue was written with Burnett singing "Many Moons Ago" as a bedtime story. In 2016, the special was included as a bonus feature on the DVD Carol + 2: The Original Queens of Comedy.

=== 2005 ===
The third television version, which aired on December 18, 2005, on ABC in the United States as part of The Wonderful World of Disney and was released on DVD two days later, starred Carol Burnett as Queen Aggravain, Denis O'Hare as Prince Dauntless, Tom Smothers as King Sextimus, Tracey Ullman as Princess Winnifred, Zooey Deschanel as Lady Larken, and Matthew Morrison as Sir Harry. It was directed by Kathleen Marshall and executive produced by Burnett and Martin Tudor. A prologue, cut from the DVD release, features a girl looking for Winnifred, her favorite princess, at Disneyland, and meets a woman (Burnett) who tells her "the real story." The Minstrel was cut from this version, except "Normandy," which was changed to a love duet between Larken and Sir Harry. A new song, "That Baby of Mine", was written for Burnett.

== Plot ==
=== Act I ===
A fictional medieval kingdom in 15th-century Europe is ruled by the devious Queen Aggravain and the mute King Sextimus the Silent. King Sextimus suffers from a curse cast by a witch that can only be reversed "when the mouse devours the hawk." The Minstrel sings of the Princess and the Pea ("Many Moons Ago"), but reveals the story to be fake, though he knows the true tale because he was there when it happened. The princess in the story is not the first princess tested to see if she is worthy of marrying Prince Dauntless the Drab—she is the thirteenth princess. The day the Minstrel arrives at court, the Queen, alongside her confidant, the Wizard, is testing Princess #12 with an unfair quiz. To the Queen's delight, the princess misses the last question: "What was the middle name of the daughter-in-law of the best friend of the blacksmith who forged the sword that killed the Beast?" and is given a rubber chicken by Sir Studley. The populace of the castle complains about an unjust law levied by Queen Aggravain: "Throughout the land no one may wed, 'till Dauntless shares his wedding bed." However, every petitioning princess is sent away after failing unfair tests devised by the Queen. It seems that no one is good enough to marry Prince Dauntless ("An Opening for a Princess").

The crisis escalates when the leading knight of the realm, Sir Harry, discovers that his girlfriend, Lady Larken, is pregnant. Though Lady Larken says that she will run away so he will never have to face embarrassment and the loss of his station, Sir Harry decides that he will set out to find a princess himself ("In a Little While"). He petitions the Queen who immediately refuses, but when Dauntless manages to speak up and beg, she gives in.

The Minstrel tells the audience that in the original story, the princess arrived at the castle on a stormy night ("Many Moons Ago - Reprise"), but in the true story, it was not night at all—and the princess only looked as though she went through a storm. Princess Winnifred the Woebegone, a brash and unrefined princess from the Marshlands, was so eager to arrive that she swam the castle moat. She immediately charms Dauntless, Studley, and the knights and most of the kingdom ("Shy"). However, she also earns the utter loathing of the evil Queen, who vows to stop her.

The King discovers Larken's pregnancy and pantomimes this to his confidants, the Minstrel and the Jester. He tells them not to say a word, but they both are more worried about the King letting it slip, because even though he is mute, he can still communicate ("The Minstrel, the Jester, and I"). Later, the Queen, assisted by the Wizard, designs a test for Winnifred based on something they are sure she doesn’t have at all—sensitivity. They will place a tiny pea beneath twenty thick downy mattresses. If Winnifred is unable to sleep due to the pea, then she will be sensitive enough to marry Dauntless ("Sensitivity").

Meanwhile, Winnifred tells Dauntless and the ladies in waiting about her home in the swamp ("The Swamps of Home") and meets the King, and they immediately like each other. Then, after spilling a purple vase filled with fresh new baby's breath, Winnifred is caught cleaning the mess by Lady Larken who mistakes her for a chambermaid. Soon Harry gets mad at Larken for her mistake and they get in a fight. Larken vows that she will run far, far away where she will never see him again.

The King, the Minstrel and the Jester catch Larken trying to run away, and they try to stop her but in the end decide to help her escape to Normandy ("Normandy"). Later that night, the Queen throws a ball so Winnifred can dance the most exhausting dance in the world: "The Spanish Panic". The Queen hopes that Winnifred will tire herself, but the plan fails. Winnifred is the last one standing as everyone collapses from exhaustion at the dance's climax. She asks Dauntless to try to give her a clue as to what the test might be, but he's not sure. He brings out a huge barbell that one of the princesses was asked to lift, but even he cannot lift it. Winnifred does easily and Dauntless admits that he loves her. Winnifred mentions that her nickname is Fred and Dauntless sings of his love for her as she practices numerous tasks she might have to do for the test, including singing, dancing, wrestling, acting, playing the Minstrel's lute, pantomiming and drinking herself unconscious ("Song of Love").

=== Act II ===
Later that night, the Queen leads the knights and ladies as they carry the twenty mattresses to Fred's room ("Quiet"), and she catches the Minstrel, the Jester, the King, and Larken (disguised in Dauntless' clothes) running away. The Minstrel tries to protect Larken by saying he was escaping with Larken against her will. The Queen declares that the Minstrel will be banished by daybreak. Fred and Dauntless study for the test, and Fred convinces Larken to fix things with Harry. Larken leaves to find Harry, Dauntless bids Fred goodnight, and now she is left alone. While studying a fairy tale, she complains about how other fairy tale princesses had it easy and how she wants to live happily ever after ("Happily Ever After"). King Sextimus has a man to man talk with Dauntless about the birds and the bees completely in pantomime ("Man to Man Talk"). The Jester and Minstrel trick the Wizard into telling them of the test and the Jester reminisces about his father's dancing days ("Very Soft Shoes").

Sir Harry and Lady Larken run into each other and they confess that their love is stronger than ever ("Yesterday I Loved You"). When Fred is finally ready for bed, the Queen tries to make her even more sleepy by attempting to hypnotize her with a hypnotic mirror, burning poppy and mandragora incense, forcing her to drink a sleeping draught, and finally bringing in the Nightingale of Samarkand to sing her to sleep ("Nightingale Lullaby"), but Winnifred is kept wide awake. It seems that there is some "lump" under the mattresses that is keeping her from relaxing. She starts counting sheep.

The next morning, Dauntless dresses in his finest to see Winnifred pass the test, but the Queen tells him to his great disappointment that the test has already happened and what it was. She says that since Winnifred has not yet emerged from her room, she must still be sleeping and therefore has failed. Dauntless is heartbroken until Winnifred drowsily stumbles into the throne room while still counting sheep; she hasn't slept a wink. Everyone is ecstatic that Winnifred has passed but the Queen insists that Dauntless should not throw himself away on Winnifred. Dauntless has had enough of his mother's attempts to control his life and finally yells, "I told you to shut up!". The curse on King Sextimus is lifted (the "mouse", Dauntless, has metaphorically devoured the "hawk", Queen Aggravain). Aggravain discovers that she cannot talk and the King can, so Dauntless and Winnifred are free to be married. The King forces the Queen to hop, skip, and jump around the room to everyone's amusement, and with this, she is forced to step down.

Finally the real reason why Winnifred passed the test is revealed: after learning about the test, the King, Minstrel, and Jester stuffed the mattresses full of weapons, jousting equipment, and other sharp items. All the items are removed by the Jester in the finale ("Finale"). After the items are removed, Winnifred still has trouble sleeping until Dauntless takes the pea out from under the mattresses; she then falls asleep almost immediately, proving that she was indeed a true princess. Everyone, in classic fairy-tale tradition, lives happily ever after.

== Characters ==
- Princess Winnifred the Woebegone - Also known by her nickname, Fred, she is the thirteenth princess tested by the Queen. She comes from the Marshland and is brought to the castle by Sir Harry. She is slightly childlike and much less refined than the rest of the castle's residents. Her kingdom, Icolmkill, was far out of where Dauntless’ kingdom had searched for princesses before, but Sir Harry was noble enough to travel far and wide to find the perfect princess.
- Prince Dauntless the Drab - The son of Queen Aggravain and King Sextimus and next in line to the throne. He is childlike and easily falls in love with Winnifred just as he had with the many princesses that have come before. He is babied by his mother until he learns to stand up to her in the musical’s finale.
- Queen Aggravain - The villain of the musical, wife of King Sextimus, and mother of Prince Dauntless, who makes every princess suing for Dauntless’ hand take the extremely hard tests she creates. She is talkative, arrogant, full of herself, and is in constant disagreement with the King despite his not being able to talk.
- King Sextimus the Silent - The (cursed) husband of Queen Aggravain, father of Prince Dauntless, and very good friend of the Jester and Minstrel. He cannot speak and communicates via pantomime before he speaks at the end and allows for Dauntless and Winnifred to be married.
- The Minstrel - The narrator of the musical. He is friends with the King and Jester.
- The Jester - A friend of the Minstrel and King, who translates for the King (who cannot speak).
- Lady Larken - A very kind and refined noblewoman who wishes to be married to Sir Harry and carries his child. She believed at first that Princess Winnifred was a chambermaid. She attempts to escape the kingdom after breaking up with Sir Harry for a night, but returns to him and they fall in love again.
- Sir Harry - A noble knight of the kingdom who is in love with Lady Larken. He is the one who searches for Princess Winnifred, after passing the mountains and the "badlands". His true reason for bringing a princess to the kingdom was so that he and Lady Larken could be married.
- The Wizard - Also known as Cardamon; a very quiet person, who usually keeps to himself, although he is basically the Queen's minion, and puts her tests for the princesses in action. He does like the Jester and Minstrel, and they bond over his past with the Jester's father.
- Ensemble - The men and women of the kingdom, who wish to be allowed to marry throughout the play. They also highly encourage Prince Dauntless to get married because they cannot be married until he does.

== Musical numbers ==
Act I

- "Overture" - Orchestra
- "Many Moons Ago" - Minstrel (Jester - 2024 revival)
- "An Opening For a Princess" - Prince Dauntless, Lady Larken, Ensemble
- "In a Little While" - Sir Harry, Lady Larken
- "In a Little While (reprise)" - Sir Harry, Lady Larken
- "On a Stormy Night" - Minstrel
- "Shy" - Princess Winnifred, Knights and Ladies
- "The Minstrel, the Jester, and I" - Minstrel, Jester and King Sextimus (in pantomime)
- "Sensitivity" - Queen Aggravain, Wizard
- "The Swamps of Home" - Princess Winnifred, Prince Dauntless, Ladies-in-Waiting
- "Normandy" - Minstrel, Jester, Larken
- "Spanish Panic" - Orchestra, Ensemble
- "Song of Love" - Prince Dauntless, Princess Winnifred, Ensemble

Act II

- "Entr'acte" - Orchestra
- "Quiet" - Queen Aggravain, Ensemble
- "Goodnight, Sweet Princess" - Prince Dauntless (1996 revival only)
- "Happily Ever After" - Princess Winnifred
- "Man to Man Talk" - Prince Dauntless and King Sextimus (In Pantomime)
- "Very Soft Shoes" - Jester
- "Yesterday I Loved You" - Sir Harry, Lady Larken
- "Nightingale Lullaby" - Nightingale of Samarkand
- "Finale" - Prince Dauntless, Princess Winnifred, Queen Aggravain, King Sextimus, Ensemble

== Cast ==
Character	Off-Broadway	Broadway	U.S. National Tour	West End	U.S. Television Special	U.S. Television Special	Broadway Revival	U.S. Television Special	Transport Group	Encores!	Broadway Revival	Ahmanson Theatre
Character	1959		1960		1964	1972	1996	2005	2015	2024		
Princess Winnifred	Carol Burnett	Carol Burnett	Dody Goodman	Jane Connell	Carol Burnett	Carol Burnett	Sarah Jessica Parker	Tracey Ullman	Jackie Hoffman	Sutton Foster	Sutton Foster	Sutton Foster
Prince Dauntless	Joseph Bova	Joseph Bova	Jack Sydow	Robin Hunter	Joseph Bova	Ken Berry	David Aaron Baker	Denis O'Hare	Jason SweetTooth Williams	Michael Urie	Michael Urie	Michael Urie
Queen Aggravain	Jane White	Jane White	Fritzi Burr	Thelma Ruby	Jane White	Jane White	Mary Lou Rosato	Carol Burnett	Lypsinka	Harriet Sansom Harris	Ana Gasteyer	Ana Gasteyer
Lady Larken	Anne Jones	Anne Jones	Carol Arthur	Patricia Lambert	Shani Wallis	Bernadette Peters	Jane Krakowski	Zooey Deschanel	Jessica Fontana	Nikki Renée Daniels	Nikki Renée Daniels	Oyoyo Joi
Sir Harry	Allen Case	Allen Case	Chet Sommers	Bill Newman	—N/a	Ron Husmann	Lewis Cleale	Matthew Morrison	Zak Resnick	Cheyenne Jackson	Will Chase	Ben Davis
King Sextimus	Jack Gilford	Will Lee	Buster Keaton	Milo O'Shea	Jack Gilford	Jack Gilford	Heath Lamberts	Tom Smothers	David Greenspan	David Patrick Kelly	David Patrick Kelly	David Patrick Kelly
Jester	Matt Mattox	Matt Mattox	Harold Lang	Max Wall	Elliott Gould	Wally Cox	David Hibbard	Michael Boatman	Cory Linger	J. Harrison Ghee	Daniel Breaker	Daniel Breaker
Minstrel	Harry Snow	Harry Snow	John Baylis	Bill Hayes	Bill Hayes	—N/a	Lawrence Clayton	—N/a	Hunter Ryan Herdlicka	—N/a	—N/a	—N/a
Wizard	Robert Weil	Robert Weil	Willy Switkes	Bill Kerr	Jack Fletcher	—N/a	—N/a	Edward Hibbert	Jay Rogers	Francis Jue	Brooks Ashmanskas	Kevin Del Aguila

=== Notable Broadway cast replacements ===
==== 1959 production ====
- Winnifred – Ann B. Davis, Patti Karr (u/s)
- Aggravain – Patti Karr (u/s)
- Jester – Stuart Hodes (u/s)

==== 1996 production ====
- Sextimus - Tom Alan Robbins (u/s)

==== 2024 production ====
- Winnifred – Kara Lindsay (s/b)

== Awards and nominations ==
=== Original Broadway production ===
Year	Award ceremony	Category	Nominee	Result
1960	Tony Award	Best Musical	Dean Fuller, Jay Thompson, Marshall Barer and Mary Rodgers	Nominated
1960	Tony Award	Best Performance by a Leading Actress in a Musical	Carol Burnett	Nominated
1960	Theatre World Award		Carol Burnett	Won

=== 1996 Broadway revival ===
Year	Award Ceremony	Category	Nominee	Result
1997	Tony Award	Best Revival of a Musical		Nominated

=== 2024 Broadway revival ===
Year	Award Ceremony	Category	Nominee	Result
2025	Drama League Awards	Outstanding Revival of a Musical		Nominated
2025	Outer Critics Circle Awards	Outstanding Revival of a Musical		Nominated
2025	Outer Critics Circle Awards	Outstanding Featured Performer in a Broadway Musical	Michael Urie	Nominated
2025	Drama Desk Awards	Outstanding Revival of a Musical		Nominated
2025	Drama Desk Awards	Outstanding Lead Performance in a Musical	Sutton Foster	Nominated
2025	Drama Desk Awards	Outstanding Featured Performance in a Musical	Michael Urie	Won
