= Barry Levinson (producer, born 1932) =

American film producer (1932–1987)

Barry Levinson (1932 – October 23, 1987) was an American film producer active during the 1970s. He was born in New York City. He died in London, England.

== Filmography ==
- 1970 First Love (a.k.a. Erste Liebe) (executive producer)
- 1970 The Only Way (producer)
- 1972 The Amazing Mr Blunden (producer)
- 1973 Catholics (a.k.a. Conflict) (producer)
- 1973 Who? (producer)
- 1974 The Internecine Project (producer and co-writer)
- 1985 Displaced Person for American Playhouse (producer)
- 1988 Suspicion for American Playhouse (producer and co-writer)
