= Gaspar de Carvajal =

Spanish Dominican missionary

Gaspar de Carvajal (c. 1500–1584) was a Spanish Dominican missionary to the New World, known for chronicling some of the explorations of the Amazon.

== Biography ==
=== Arrival in the New World and the Amazonian Expedition ===
De Carvajal was born in Trujillo. After entering the Dominican order in Spain, he set out for Peru in 1533, dedicating himself to the conversion of the Native American aboriginals. In 1540, Carvajal joined as a chaplain the expedition of Gonzalo Pizarro, governor of Quito, which was searching for La Canela, the supposed "Land of Cinnamon", to the east of Quito.

The expedition, under difficult conditions, crossed the Andes and into the Amazonian jungle, an inhospitable territory devoid of provisions. Gonzalo Pizarro ordered his second in command, Francisco de Orellana to follow the Napo River with fifty men, in order to find its mouth. The hope was that the men would be able to find provisions and bring them back in the small boat in which they went. Orellana reached the confluence of the Napo and Trinidad River, but he didn't find provisions. Unable to return because of the current, he decided to continue following the river, until he reached the estuary of the Amazon in 1542.

=== The Relación and Carvajal's mark on history ===
Carvajal, who was one of the survivors of the expedition, narrated the events in his work Relación del nuevo descubrimiento del famoso río Grande que descubrió por muy gran ventura el capitán Francisco de Orellana ("Account of the recent discovery of the famous Grand river which was discovered by great good fortune by Captain Francisco de Orellana"). In it, the friar recorded the dates of the expedition as well as a large number of notes of ethnological interest such as the sizes and dispositions of the indigenous peoples which occupied the banks of the river, their tactics of war, rituals, customs, utensils, and the like.

This work remained obscure for a long period, being published only in 1894 by the Chilean José Toribio Medina. Parts of Relación, in addition to interviews of Orellana and some of his men, were used by Gonzalo Fernández de Oviedo in his Historia general y natural de las Indias ("General and Natural History of the Indies"), which was written in 1542, but not published until 1855. In 1934, Relación was again published, this time extensively revised by Harry Clifton Heaton (1885–1950), professor of Romance languages at New York University. It is in a large extent due to Relación that Friar Carvajal is remembered in history.

Father Carvajal's diary of the Orellana expedition has achieved prominence recently. For over four centuries, scholars dismissed its reports of large cities, well developed roads, monumental construction, fortified towns, and dense populations. It was thought that the acidic soils of Amazonia could not support the level of agriculture necessary to sustain such a civilization. His writings were largely dismissed as fabrications and propaganda. However, research by Prümers et al., published in Nature (2022) shows that his reporting is very likely to be correct.

=== Later career amongst the Indians ===
Upon his return to Peru, Carvajal was chosen as subprior of the Convent of San Rosario in Lima. In this post, he was chosen to arbitrate between the viceroy, Blasco Núñez Vela, and the auditors of the Real Audiencia in 1544. Unfortunately, the mediation seems to have been unfruitful. After the pacification of Peru, he was sent by his superiors as a missionary to Tucumán, now in Argentina, being named the protector of the Indians in that area.

He worked for years in the region, achieving the conversion of the majority of indigenous people. In 1553 he was instituted as the prior of the convent of Huamanga and provincial of Tucumán. He brought a number of Dominicans to the province, with whose help he founded various reducciones de indios and nine Spanish municipalities. He was chosen to be provincial of Peru in 1557, dedicating two years to the organization of the province and the two following ones to the visiting of the most remote territories and the founding of new convents. There is evidence of a letter written by Carvajal to the king, informing him of the abuses that were being committed against the Indians in the mines of Peru, and asking for his intervention on their behalf. This shows a general attitude towards the Indians consistent with the doctrine of his brother Dominican Bartolomé de las Casas.

In 1565 Carvajal was chosen as a representative of his province before the Spanish court and to the Pope, but it is likely that he never crossed the ocean. He died in Lima in 1584.

Not knowing it, the expedition of Gaspar de Carvajal carried diseases of the Old World, particularly smallpox, malaria and yellow fever into the deep areas of the Amazon. "One writer (Antonio Vieira, 1842) estimated that in the 37 years between 1615 and 1652, more than two million Indians living on the lower Amazon died as a result of these newly-introduced diseases.

== In popular culture ==
Werner Herzog's 1972 film Aguirre, the Wrath of God has an appearance of Gaspar de Carvajal (as played by actor Del Negro) as a craven chaplain and chronicler of the mad descent of the Amazon by Lope de Aguirre. This expedition, which took place in 1561 (almost twenty years after that of Orellana), was the source of inspiration for the movie. Additionally, Carvajal is depicted as being killed by natives. However, the film included many situations and persons from the chronicle of Carvajal, which is to say, from the expedition of Orellana.
