= Del Negro (actor) =

American–Spanish film actor and painter

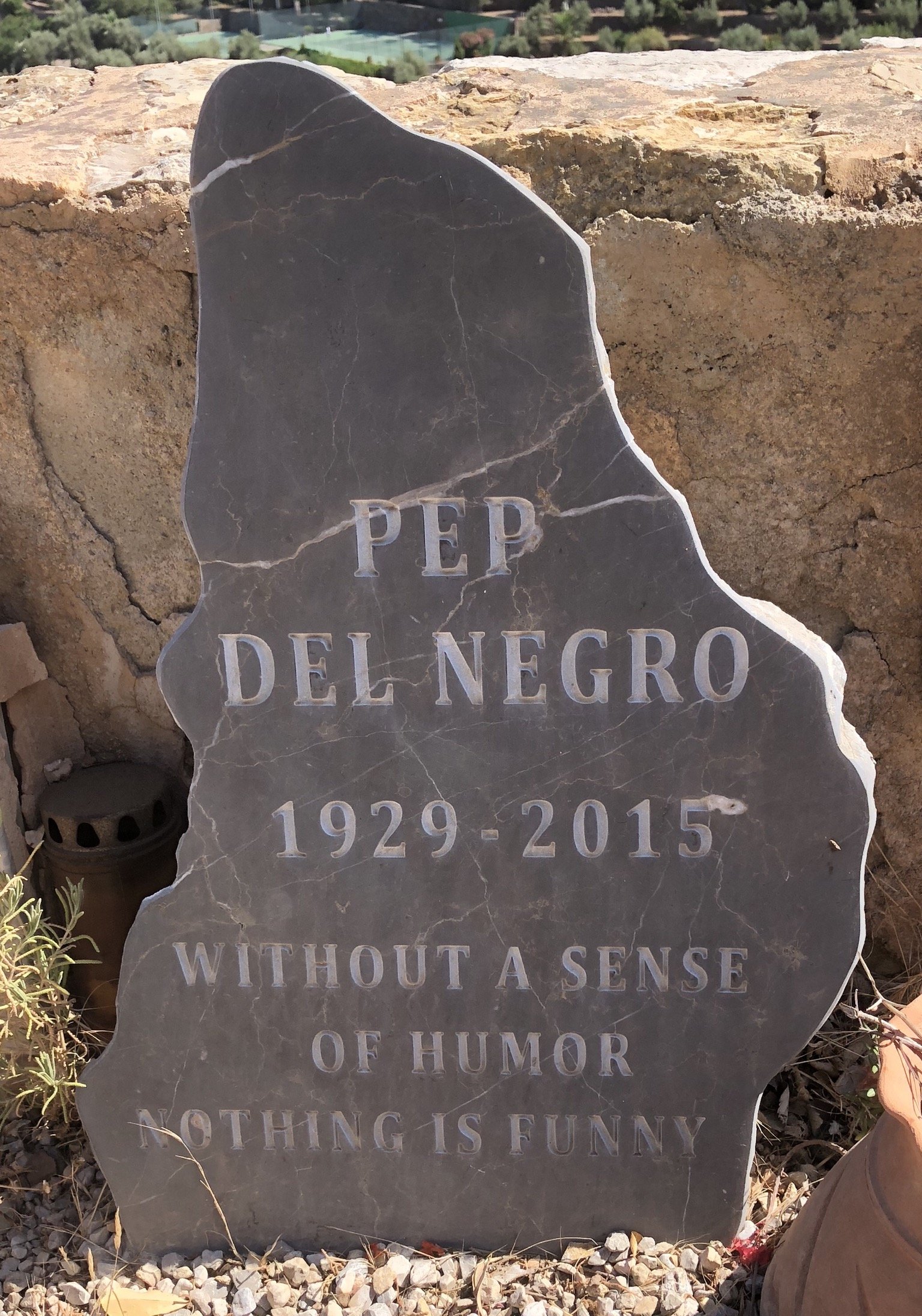
Gravestone of Joseph "Pep" Del Negro in Deià, Mallorca, Spain

Joseph Nicolas Antonio Del Negro (1929–2015), known professionally as Del Negro, was an American–Spanish film actor and painter. He played Brother Gaspar de Carvajal in Werner Herzog's Aguirre, the Wrath of God.

== Filmography ==
- Joy House (1964) as Mick (credited as Negro)
- Is Paris Burning? (1966) as Officer with Chaban-Delmas
- Mission to Tokyo (1966)
- The Enemies (De vijanden, 1968) as Mike (American soldier)
- Money-Money (1969) as Ralph Johnson
- Vampira (1971, TV Movie) as Schwarzer Magier
- Aguirre, the Wrath of God (1972) as Gaspar de Carvajal
- Pan (1973)
- Sylvie (1973, TV Movie)
- Who? (1974) as FBI Agent
- Inki (1974)
- Depression (1975, TV Movie)
- Mansion of the Doomed (1976) as Black Intern
- Summer Night Fever (1978) (credited as Joseph N. Delnegro)
- Barcelona South (1981) (final film role)
