= Trevor Howard =

English actor (1913–1988)

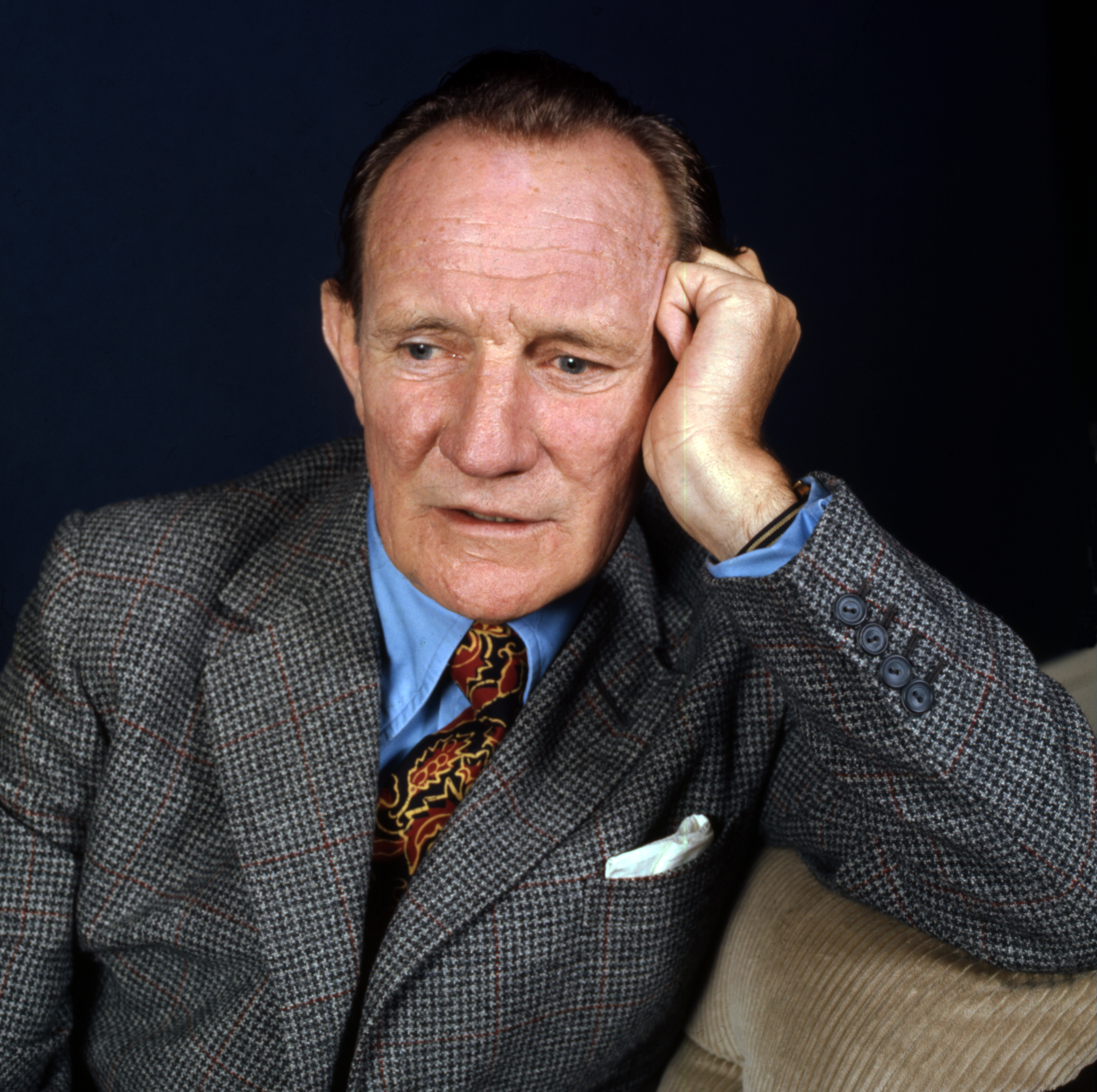
- Trevor Howard, 1973
- Born: Trevor Wallace Howard-Smith; 29 September 1913; Cliftonville, Kent, England
- Died: 7 January 1988 (aged 74); Arkley, London, England
- Resting place: St Peter's Church, Arkley
- Occupation: Actor
- Years active: 1934–1988
- Spouse: Helen Cherry (m. 1944)

Trevor Wallace Howard-Smith (29 September 1913 – 7 January 1988) was an English stage and screen actor. After varied work in the theatre, he achieved leading man star status in the film Brief Encounter (1945), followed by The Third Man (1949), portraying what BFI Screenonline called "a new kind of male lead in British films: steady, middle-class, reassuring ... but also capable of suggesting neurosis under the tweedy demeanour."

Howard was nominated for the BAFTA Award for Best Actor four times, winning for The Key (1958), and received a nomination for the Academy Award for Best Actor for his performance in Sons and Lovers (1960). His other notable film performances include Golden Salamander (1950), The Clouded Yellow (1951), Mutiny on the Bounty (1962), The Charge of the Light Brigade (1968), Battle of Britain (1969), Lola (1969), Ryan's Daughter (1970), Superman (1978), Gandhi (1982), and White Mischief (1987). He was also an Emmy Award recipient, and a three-time Golden Globe nominee.

== Early life ==
Howard was born in Cliftonville, Kent, England the son of Mabel Grey (Wallace) and Arthur John Howard-Smith, an insurance agent. His parents married in 1909. Although Howard later claimed to have been born in 1916 (the year quoted by most reference sources) he was actually born in 1913 (which is supported by school and other records).

His father was an insurance underwriter for Lloyd's of London, serving as representative in Colombo, Ceylon and elsewhere; Trevor spent the first eight years of his life travelling around the world. He was educated at Clifton College(to which he left in his will a substantial legacy for a drama scholarship) and at the Royal Academy of Dramatic Art (RADA). In 1933, at the end of his first year, he was chosen as best actor in his class for his performance as Benedict in a school production of Much Ado About Nothing. While Howard was still studying, he made his professional debut at the Gate Theatre in Revolt in a Reformatory (1934).

When he left school he worked regularly on stage, including in Sheridan's The Rivals, several performances at Stratford-upon-Avon, and in a two-year run in the original production of French Without Tears.

== Military service ==
Around 1945, journalists began to circulate stories stating that Howard had a courageous wartime service in the British Army's Royal Corps of Signals, which earned him much respect among fellow actors and fans. The police visited Howard, warning him that it was a crime to claim a medal under the Army Act, but Howard assured them he was not the source of the stories. In fact, he "did his best to dodge the call-up", and journalist Terrence Pettigrew, in his 2001 biography of Howard, recounted that files held in the Public Record Office revealed he was actually discharged from the British Army in 1943 for mental instability and having a "psychopathic personality", on account of having "lied about his background, from his schooldays onward ... determinedly".

Initially Howard's widow, actress Helen Cherry, denied this, but after being confronted with the official records, she said that Howard's mother had claimed he was a holder of the Military Cross, adding that her late husband had an honourable military record with "nothing to be ashamed of".

According to The London Gazette, Trevor Wallace Howard-Smith (247202) was commissioned into the South Staffordshire Regiment as a second lieutenant effective 3 October 1942; only to relinquish his commission "on account of "ill-health" on 2 October 1943. This contradicted the postwar stories that he had won the Military Cross and high promotion.

== Career ==
After a theatrical role in The Recruiting Officer (1943), Howard began working in films with an uncredited part The Way Ahead (1944), directed by Carol Reed. He was in a big stage hit, A Soldier for Christmas (1944), and a production of Eugene O'Neill's Anna Christie (1944). Howard received his first film credit for The Way to the Stars (1945), playing a pilot.

Howard's performance in The Way Ahead came to the attention of David Lean, who was looking for someone to play the role of Alec in Brief Encounter (1945). Lean recommended him to Noël Coward, who agreed with the suggestion, and the success of the film launched Howard's film career.

He followed it with I See a Dark Stranger (1946) with Deborah Kerr, and Green for Danger (1947), starring Alastair Sim. Both films were successful as was They Made Me a Fugitive (1947). That year British exhibitors voted Howard the 10th most popular British star at the box office. So Well Remembered (1948) was made with American talent and money and was a hit in Britain but lost money overall. Howard was reunited with Lean for The Passionate Friends (1949), but the film was not a success.

In contrast, Carol Reed's The Third Man (1949, from a story by Graham Greene), in which Howard starred alongside Orson Welles and Joseph Cotten, was a huge international success, and became the film of which Howard was most proud. During the filming of The Third Man in Vienna, he visited a bar still wearing his British Army officer's uniform costume and, following an altercation, was detained for impersonation by the Royal Military Police. When identified, he was released without further ado.

Howard was the lead in Golden Salamander (1950) and played Peter Churchill in Odette (1950) with Anna Neagle, a big hit in Britain. It was directed by Herbert Wilcox who put Howard under contract. He loaned Howard to Betty Box and Ralph Thomas to make The Clouded Yellow (1950), a popular thriller with Jean Simmons. These films helped Howard be voted the 2nd biggest British star at the box office in 1950 and the 5th biggest (and eleventh bigger over-all) in 1951.

Howard was reunited with Carol Reed for Outcast of the Islands (1952) and he made a war film, Gift Horse (1952). That year he made his final appearance on the list of Britain's ten most popular actors, coming in at number nine. He was in another adaptation of a Graham Greene story, The Heart of the Matter (1953). Greene also wrote and produced Howard's next film, the British-Italian The Stranger's Hand (1954). Howard was in a French movie, The Lovers of Lisbon (1955), then supported Jose Ferrer in a war film from Warwick Pictures, The Cockleshell Heroes (1955), which was popular in Britain.

Howard's first Hollywood film was Run for the Sun (1956), where he played a villain to Richard Widmark's hero. He made a cameo in Around the World in 80 Days (1956) and again played a villain to an American star, Victor Mature, in Warwick's Interpol (1957).

Howard starred in Manuela (1957) then supported William Holden in Carol Reed's The Key (1958), for which he received the Best Actor award from the British Academy of Film and Television Arts. When William Holden dropped out of the lead of The Roots of Heaven (1958), Howard stepped in as his first opportunity at a starring role in a Hollywood film (although top billing still went to Errol Flynn).

After a thriller Moment of Danger (1960) he was in Sons and Lovers (1960), for which he was nominated for an Academy Award for Best Actor. He was nominated for a BAFTA on four other occasions. and received two other Emmy nominations, one as a lead and the other as a supporting actor. He also received three Golden Globe Award nominations.

Howard was reunited with Holden for The Lion (1962). He was Captain Bligh to Marlon Brando's Fletcher Christian in MGM's remake of Mutiny on the Bounty (1962). He was in a TV movie production of Hedda Gabler (1962) and played the title prime minister in "The Invincible Mr Disraeli" (1963), an episode of the Hallmark Hall of Fame for which he won an Emmy Award for his role then supported Robert Mitchum in Man in the Middle (1964) and Cary Grant in Father Goose (1964). After a cameo in Operation Crossbow (1965), Howard supported Frank Sinatra in Von Ryan's Express (1965), Brando and Yul Brynner in Morituri (1965), and Rod Taylor in The Liquidator (1965). After a leading role in The Poppy Is Also a Flower (1966) he made two movies with Brynner, Triple Cross (1966) and The Long Duel (1967).

Howard had a change of pace supporting Hayley Mills in Pretty Polly (1968). He went back to military roles: The Charge of the Light Brigade (1968), as Lord Cardigan, and Battle of Britain (1969), as Air Vice Marshal Keith Park. He had support parts in Lola (1969) and Ryan's Daughter (1970), the latter for David Lean.

He made a Swedish film The Night Visitor (1971) then settled into a career as a character actor: To Catch a Spy (1971), supporting Kirk Douglas; Mary, Queen of Scots (1971), as Sir William Cecil; Kidnapped (1971); Pope Joan (1972); Ludwig (1972); The Offence (1972), with Sean Connery; A Doll's House (1973), for Joseph Losey; Who? (1974), supporting Elliott Gould; and Catholics (1974) for British TV.

He appeared in some horror films, including Craze (1974), Persecution (1974), and 11 Harrowhouse (1974) alongside his wife Helen Cherry. In The Count of Monte Cristo (1975), he mentored Richard Chamberlain. He played military men in Hennessy (1975) and Conduct Unbecoming (1975). Around this time he complained that he had to work so hard because of the high rate of tax in Britain.

Howard appeared in Albino (1976), shot in Rhodesia; The Bawdy Adventures of Tom Jones (1976); Aces High (1976); Eliza Fraser (1976), shot in Australia; The Last Remake of Beau Geste (1977); and Stevie (1978). He was one of many names in Superman (1978), Hurricane (1979), Meteor (1979) and The Sea Wolves (1980). He appeared in a TV series Shillingbury Tales (1980–81). One of his strangest films, and one he took great delight in, was Vivian Stanshall's Sir Henry at Rawlinson End (1980), in which he played the title role. He and Celia Johnson from Brief Encounter were reunited in Staying On (1980) for British TV.

Howard was also top-billed in Windwalker (1981).

== Final years ==
Howard appeared in some prestigious movies towards the end of his career: The Deadly Game (1982), The Missionary (1982), Gandhi (1982), George Washington (1984), Shaka Zulu (1986), Dust (1985), and Peter the Great (1986).

At the time of filming White Mischief (1988) on location in Kenya during 1987, Howard was seriously ill and suffering from alcoholism. The company wanted to sack him, but co-star Sarah Miles was determined that Howard's distinguished film career would not end that way. In an interview with Terence Pettigrew for his biography of Howard, Miles describes how she gave an ultimatum to the executives, threatening to quit the production if they got rid of him. His final film role was in The Dawning in 1988.

Throughout his film career Howard insisted that all his contracts include a clause excusing him from work whenever a cricket Test match was being played.

Howard recorded two Shakespeare performances, the first, recorded in the 1960s, was as Petruchio opposite Margaret Leighton's Kate in Caedmon Records' complete recording of The Taming of the Shrew; the second was in the title role of King Lear for the BBC World Service in 1986.

== Personal life ==
He married stage and screen actress Helen Cherry.

A British government document leaked to the Sunday Times in 2003 showed that Howard was among almost 300 people to decline an official honour of the United Kingdom. He declined to be made a CBE in 1982.

== Death ==
Howard died, aged 74, at his home in Arkley, Barnet on 7 January 1988. The cause of death was hepatic failure and cirrhosis of the liver.

== Appearances ==
=== Filmography ===
- The Way Ahead (1944) as Officer on Ship (uncredited)
- The Way to the Stars (1945) as Squadron Leader Carter
- Brief Encounter (1945) as Alec Harvey
- I See a Dark Stranger (1946) as David Baynes
- Green for Danger (1946) as Dr. Barnes
- They Made Me a Fugitive (1947) as Clem
- So Well Remembered (1947) as Richard Whiteside
- The Passionate Friends (1949) as Professor Steven Stratton
- The Third Man (1949) as Maj. Calloway
- Golden Salamander (1950) as David Redfern
- Odette (1950) as Captain Peter Churchill / Raoul
- The Clouded Yellow (1950) as Maj. David Somers
- Lady Godiva Rides Again (1951) as Guest at Theater Accepting Program (uncredited)
- Outcast of the Islands (1952) as Peter Willems
- Gift Horse (1952) as Lieutenant Commander Hugh Algernon Fraser
- The Heart of the Matter (1953) as Harry Scobie
- La mano dello straniero (1954) as Major Roger Court
- Les amants du Tage (1955) as Inspector Lewis
- The Cockleshell Heroes (1955) as Captain Thompson
- Run for the Sun (1956) as Browne
- Around the World in 80 Days (1956) as Denis Fallentin – Reform Club Member
- April in Portugal (1956) as the narrator
- Interpol (1957) as Frank McNally
- Manuela (1957) as James Prothero, released as Stowaway Girl in the US
- A Day in Trinidad, Land of Laughter (1957, Short) as Narrator
- The Key (1958) as Captain Chris Ford
- The Roots of Heaven (1958) as Morel
- Moment of Danger (1960) as John Bain
- Sons and Lovers (1960) as Walter Morel
- The Lion (1962) as John Bullit
- Mutiny on the Bounty (1962) as Captain William Bligh
- Man in the Middle (1963) as Major John Darryl Kensington
- Father Goose (1964) as Houghton
- Operation Crossbow (1965) as Professor Lindermann
- Von Ryan's Express (1965) as Maj. Eric Fincham
- Morituri (1965) as Colonel Statter
- The Liquidator (1965) as Mostyn
- Eagle in a Cage (1965, Hallmark Hall of Fame) as Napoleon
- The Poppy Is Also a Flower (1966) as Sam Lincon
- Triple Cross (1966) MI 5
- The Long Duel (1967) as Young
- Pretty Polly (1967) as Robert Hook
- The Charge of the Light Brigade (1968) as Lord Cardigan
- Battle of Britain (1969) as Air Vice-Marshal Sir Keith Park
- Twinky (1969) as Lola's Grandfather
- Ryan's Daughter (1970) as Father Hugh Collins
- The Night Visitor (1971) as The Inspector
- To Catch a Spy (1971) as Sir Trevor Dawson
- Mary, Queen of Scots (1971) as William Cecil
- Pope Joan (1972) as Pope Leo
- Ludwig (1972) as Richard Wagner
- The Offence (1972) as Detective Superintendent Cartwright
- Kidnapped (1973) as Lord Advocate Grant
- A Doll's House (1973) as Dr Rank
- Who? (1973) as Colonel Azarin
- Catholics (1973) as The Abbot
- Craze (1974) as Supt. Bellamy
- 11 Harrowhouse (1974) as Clyde Massey
- Persecution (1974) aka Sheba, The Graveyard, The Terror of Sheba as Paul Bellamy
- Cause for Concern (1974) as Narrator
- The Count of Monte Cristo (1975, TV movie) as Abbe Faria
- Hennessy (1975) as Commander Rice
- Conduct Unbecoming (1975) as Colonel Benjamin Strang
- Albino (1976) as Johannes
- The Bawdy Adventures of Tom Jones (1976) as Squire Western
- Aces High (1976) as Silkin
- Eliza Fraser (1976) as Captain Foster Fyans
- The Last Remake of Beau Geste (1977) as Sir Hector
- Babel Yemen (1977 short) as Narrator
- Slavers (1978) as Alec Mackenzie
- Stevie (1978) as The Man
- Superman (1978) as 1st Elder
- The Spirit of Adventure: Night Flight (1979, TV Movie) as Riviere
- Hurricane (1979) as Father Malone
- Meteor (1979) as Sir Michael Hughes
- Flashpoint Africa (1980) as Programme Controller
- The Shillingbury Blowers (1980) as Dan 'Saltie' Wicklow
- The Sea Wolves (1980) as Jack Cartwright
- Sir Henry at Rawlinson End (1980) as Sir Henry Rawlinson
- Windwalker (1980) as Windwalker
- Staying On (1980 TV movie) as Colonel Tusker Smalley
- Arch of Triumph (1980)
- Light Years Away, aka Les Années lumière (1981) as Yoshka Poliakeff
- The Great Muppet Caper (1981) as Aggressive Man in Restaurant (uncredited)
- No Country for Old Men (1981, TV Movie)
- Inside the Third Reich (1982, TV Movie) as Professor Heinrich Tessnow
- Deadly Game (1982, TV Movie) as Gustave Kummer
- The Missionary (1982) as Lord Henry Ames
- Gandhi (1982) as Judge R. S. Broomfield
- Sword of the Valiant (1984) as The King
- Dust (1985) as Le père
- God Rot Tunbridge Wells! (1985) as Georg Frederich Handel
- Memory of the Camps (1985, Documentary) as Narrator
- Time After Time (1986) as Brigadier
- Foreign Body (1986) as Dr Stirrup
- Christmas Eve (1986, TV Movie) as Maitland
- Hand in Glove (1987, TV Movie) as Vicar
- White Mischief (1988) as Jack Soames
- The Unholy (1988) as Father Silva
- The Dawning (1988) as Grandfather

=== Television ===
- Origins of the Mafia (1976 miniseries) as Don Consalvo Saccone
- The Love Boat (1984 TV Series) as Sir Albert Demerest
- George Washington (1984 miniseries) as Lord Fairfax
- Shaka Zulu (1986–1989) as Lord Charles Somerset (final appearance)
- Peter the Great (1986 TV series) as Sir Isaac Newton

== See also ==
- List of Academy Award winners and nominees from Great Britain
- List of actors with Academy Award nominations

== Notes ==
Citations

Bibliography

- Drazin, Charles (1999). In Search of the Third Man. Methuen. ISBN 0413739309.
- Knight, Vivienne (1986). Trevor Howard: A Gentleman and a Player. Muller, Blond & White. ISBN 978-0584111361.
- Munn, Michael (June 1989). Trevor Howard: The Man and his Films. Robson Books Ltd. ISBN 978-0860515395.
- Pettigrew, Terence (2001). Trevor Howard: A Personal Biography. Peter Owen. ISBN 978-0720611243.
