= Willy Switkes =

American actor

- Born: November 12, 1929; Washington, D.C.
- Died: March 7, 2013 (aged 83); Rockville, Maryland

William B. "Willy" Switkes (November 12, 1929 – March 7, 2013) was an American character actor who appeared in more than eighty films throughout his career. He appeared in a notable scene as a passenger in a taxi cab with Dustin Hoffman in the 1982 comedic film, Tootsie. In the scene, Switkes was thrown from the taxi when his character attempted to cut in front of Hoffman's.

He was born in Washington D.C. in 1929. He moved to New York City in 1955, where he resided for most of his life, to pursue acting.

Switkes film credits also included roles in The Arrangement in 1969, Bananas in 1971, The French Connection in 1971, Taxi Driver in 1976, An Unmarried Woman in 1978, Dressed to Kill in 1980, Playing for Keeps in 1986, and Ghostbusters II in 1989.

Switkes also enjoyed a long career in Broadway theatre. He was the understudy of Buster Keaton in Once Upon a Mattress in 1960, in which he also played the Wizard in the musical comedy. he co-starred as Smee in the touring production of Peter Pan opposite Cathy Rigby, who played Peter Pan. His other Broadway productions included A Country Scandal, A Thousand Clowns, The Cherry Orchard, Saint Joan of the Stockyards, Sly Fox, and What the Butler Saw.

Willy Switkes died from colon cancer at Montgomery Hospice Casey House in Rockville, Maryland, on March 7, 2013, at the age of 83.

== Filmography ==
Year	Title	Role	Notes
1969	The Arrangement	Man	Uncredited
1971	Bananas	Man	Uncredited
1971	The French Connection	Man	Uncredited
1982	Tootsie	Man at Cab	
1986	Playing for Keeps	Mint Buyer, 'No Change'	(final film role)
