= Who? (novel) =

1958 novel by Algis Budrys

- Cover of first paperback edition
- Author: Algis Budrys
- Language: English
- Genre: Science fiction
- Publisher: Pyramid Books
- Publication date: 1958
- Publication place: United States
- Media type: Print (hardback & paperback)
- Pages: 157

Who? is a 1958 science fiction novel by American writer Algis Budrys, set during the Cold War. It was originally a short story, inspired, as its author claimed, by a Kelly Freas painting he had seen in the offices of the magazine Fantastic Universe, and published in that magazine in April 1955.

The novel was adapted into a 1974 film of the same name, starring Elliott Gould.

== Plot ==
The book assumes that the Cold War will culminate in the East and West bloc uniting into two super-states, all smaller allies or satellites of the United States and Soviet Union being annexed and losing their individual identity. This development, which did not happen in actual history, has various implications for the book's plot.

During the Cold War period, an explosion from an experiment in an Allied research facility near the border with the Soviet Bloc, allows a Soviet team, under the pretense of offering help, to abduct Lucas Martino, a leading Allied physicist in charge of a secret, high-priority project called K-88.

Several months later, under American pressure, the Soviet officials finally hand over an individual. The Soviets state and the individual claims that he is Martino. The man has undergone extensive surgery for his injuries. He has a mechanical arm that is more advanced than any produced in the West. His head is now a featureless metal skull, through craniofacial prosthesis. The Allies' medical evaluation reveals that several of the man's internal organs are also artificial. His biological arm and its hand's fingerprints are identified as Martino's, though this may be the result of an arm and hand transplant. The Allies cannot be certain whether the Soviets have sent them Martino or a technologically altered spy while holding the real Martino for interrogation on his scientific knowledge.

Allied counterintelligence agent Shawn Rogers is tasked to verify the person's true identity but he's unable to reach a satisfactory conclusion. The man is released, but kept under surveillance and barred from working on physics projects.

In flashbacks, we learn Lucas Martino's story. Young Martino grows up in an Italian American New Jersey farm community, with English as his second language, then works his way through the City College of New York, and graduate studies at MIT. He meets a girl, Barbara, older than him and more experienced, in his uncle's coffee shop where he starts working. Barbara takes a liking to him but nothing happens. Lucas meets young Edith Chester, an art student, and they start a tentative friendship, both romantically attracted to each other though awkward at it. Eventually, Martino moves to Boston for his studies and he loses touch with Edith. In MIT, he rooms with a bright and friendly student, Francis Heywood.

In the present, Martino, shadowed by Allied intelligence, tracks down Edith. She is a widow raising a child. They meet and she declares she loved him then and still loves him now. Martino hesitates. Edith's child wakes up and is scared by Martino's appearance. He runs away, with Edith comforting her daughter, telling her that that man is no longer important.

In another flashback, we learn that the Soviets had planned to send a spy back to the Allies: Martino's former MIT room mate Heywood, who has undergone a surgery like Martino's to hide his true identity. Heywood would survive an airplane accident and be presented to the Allies as a rescued and reconstructed Martino, but the plane, due to a random event, crashes away from the pre-determined rescue point and the Soviet plan is foiled. The Soviet intelligence officer, Anastas Azarin, who had interrogated the captive Martino through physical torture, without breaking him, can only send Martino back to the Allies.

Years later, the K-88 project cannot progress and the Allied authorities decide to risk seeking the alleged Martino's assistance, although the identity issue is still unresolved. Rogers is sent to ask the man to come back to work, and finds him residing in the old New Jersey farm, working tirelessly to keep it running, fighting against "every day's decay," as he tells Rogers. The man refuses to come back to work on the project, exclaiming that he is no longer a physicist but a farmer. Rogers acknowledges his people will continue to monitor the man's whereabouts until his end. Rogers wonders aloud whether the man is actually Martino, and the man responds "in a deep voice, as if he remembered something difficult and worthy of pride he's done when young."

=== Key characters ===
- Lucas Martino, Allied physicist, kidnapped by the Soviets
- Shawn Rogers, Allied counter intelligence agent assigned to determine the identity of the released man
- Anastas Azarin, Soviet agent who interrogates Martino
- Edith Chester-Hays, former friend of young Martino
- Francis Heywood, Soviet spy who befriended Martino while both were in MIT

== Film adaptation ==
In 1974, the novel was adapted into a film of the same name, directed by Jack Gold and starring Elliott Gould, Trevor Howard, and Joseph Bova.
