= Who? (film) =

1974 British film by Jack Gold

- Theatrical release poster
- Directed by: Jack Gold
- Written by: John Gould
- Based on: Who? by Algis Budrys
- Produced by: Barry Levinson; Kurt Berthold (co-producer)
- Starring: Elliott Gould; Trevor Howard; Joseph Bova
- Cinematography: Petrus R. Schlömp
- Edited by: Norman Wanstall
- Music by: John Cameron
- Production companies: Lion International; Hemisphere
- Distributed by: British Lion Films
- Release dates: 19 April 1974 (United Kingdom); August 1975 (United States)
- Running time: 93 minutes
- Countries: United Kingdom; United States; West Germany
- Language: English

Who? (also known as The Man in the Steel Mask, Roboman, Robo Man and Prisoner of the Skull) is a 1974 British-American science fiction film directed by Jack Gold and starring Elliott Gould, Trevor Howard and Joseph Bova. It was written by John Gould based on the 1958 novel of the same name by Algis Budrys.

== Plot summary ==
An enigmatic individual with a metal face is returned from East Germany and claims to be Lucas Martino, an American scientist who was working on a top-secret project but was severely injured and scarred in a car crash. American authorities hold him in custody while they try to establish whether the man is the real Martino or an impostor looking for secret information about the ultimate rocket project developed in the West.

== Cast ==
- Elliott Gould as Sean Rogers
- Trevor Howard as Colonel Azarin
- Joseph Bova as Lucas Martino
- Ed Grover as Finchley
- James Noble as General Deptford
- John Lehne as Haller
- Kay Tornborg as Edith
- Lyndon Brook as Dr. Barrister
- Joy Garrett as Barbara
- Michael Lombard as Dr. Besser
- John Stewart as Frank Heywood
- Ivan Desny as general Stürmer
- Alexander Allerson as Dr. Kothu
- Bruce Boa as Miller
- Fred Vincent as Douglas
- Dan Sazarino as uncle Lucas
- Craig McConnel as Tonino
- Herb Andress as FBI agent
- Del Negro as FBI agent
- Frank Schuller as FBI agent

== Production ==
The film was part financed by British Lion. It was filmed in 1973 in Germany with a German crew and English editor.

Jack Gold said he consciously made the film because it was different to other movies he had done. He said, "It’s a strange area for me and I’m not sure how comfortable I was in it, how uncomfortable the film is at the end. . . But it was intriguing. And I’m trying to stretch myself into different areas, which I did. But I’m not sure. I’ve never been as unsure in a way about what the thing is like, about my own relationship to it."

== Release ==
Although one 1983 British source stated that the film was shelved for five years after its completion in 1974, contemporary sources indicate the film was screened theatrically in the U.S. in 1975, and broadcast on British television in 1976.

== Critical reception ==
The Monthly Film Bulletin wrote: "While there are clear signs of haste and penny-pinching in its lapses of continuity, and sets that are more symbolic than sumptuous, it has a no-nonsense directness in telling its story which, in the form of Algis Budrys' original novel, had the distinction of being superbly constructed in the first place. ... Where the book maintains the ambiguities to the end, the film admits to being a detective story by delivering its answer just in time for the final sequence to turn into a somewhat suspect hymn to the joys of good, hard toil. The land, it would seem, has more to offer than the laboratory – for all that Martino himself would seem to be the ultimate achievement in prosthetics. Perhaps to avert our attention from too close a scrutiny of this paradox, perhaps as a concession to the supposed requirements of the box office, Who? takes time off for a tolerably exciting car-chase and some later business with an FBI agent which does considerable damage by its sheer implausibility. And where Gold has clearly found congenial material in Trevor Howard as the Russian spymaster, he is less successful with Elliott Gould, whose hectoring phrases and exaggerated scowls appear the more mannered beside the expressionless little victim of his aggression. Like Martino himself, Who? finally gives the impression of something quite out of the ordinary that has lost the struggle to make itself heard. And like Martino, it survives as a patchwork of disparate material for which nobody, sadly, could find much use."

The Iowa Gazette described it as "distinctly average but better than mediocre".

The Kentucky Courier-Journal dismissed it as a "clinker", calling it an "inane... funereal mess".
