= Joseph Bova =

American actor

- Born: May 25, 1924; Cleveland, Ohio
- Died: March 12, 2006 (aged 81); Englewood, New Jersey

Joseph Bova (May 25, 1924 – March 12, 2006) was an American actor. He worked in early television, having a children's show on WABC-TV in New York, and played Prince Dauntless in the Broadway musical Once Upon a Mattress, starring Carol Burnett.

Bova was born in Cleveland, Ohio, the son of Mary (née Catalano) and Anthony Bova. He died of emphysema at retirement home in Englewood, New Jersey. He was 81 years old.

== Filmography ==
| Year | Title | Role | Notes |
|---|---|---|---|
| 1961 | The Young Doctors | Dr. Shawcross | |
| 1968 | Pretty Poison | Pete | |
| 1972 | Up the Sandbox | John | |
| 1973 | Serpico | Potts | |
| 1974 | Who? | Dr. Martino / Lucas Martino | |
| 1975 | Kojak | Morrie Rogaz | S3 E8 "Out of the Frying Pan" |
| 1985 | Tales from the Darkside | Lew Feldman | TV episode "Distant Signals" |
| 1987 | Morgan Stewart's Coming Home | Emily's Father | |
