= Taki =

Taki may refer to:

== People ==
- Iwao Taki (1901–1984), Japanese malacologist
- Kōji Taki (1928–2011), Japanese critic and philosopher
- Kumari Taki (born 1999), Kenyan middle-distance runner
- Makoto Taki (born 1938), Japanese politician
- Masami Taki (born 1972), Japanese football manager
- Michiyo Taki (fl. 1927), Japanese football player
- Mohamed Taki (athlete) (born 1971), Moroccan runner
- Mohamed Taki Abdoulkarim (1936–1998), former president of the Comoros
- Natsuki Taki (born 1993), Japanese announcer
- Pāora Taki (died 1897), New Zealand tribal leader and warrior.
- Pierre Taki (born 1967), Japanese singer and actor, member of Denki Groove
- Princess Taki (died 751), Japanese princess during the Asuka period
- Rentarō Taki (1879–1903), Japanese pianist and composer
- Rion Taki (born 1992), Japanese football player
- Tage Taki (born 1962), Indian politician
- Thozamile Taki (born 1971), South African serial killer
- Yukari Taki (born 1987), Japanese actress and tarento
- Yūta Taki (born 1999), Japanese football player
- Taki Theodoracopulos (born 1936), Greek-born journalist, founder of Taki's Magazine
- TAKI 183 (born 1953–1954), American graffiti artist
- Taki Inoue (born 1963), retired Japanese racing driver
- Taki Saito (born 2000), Filipina actress and singer, member of Faky
- Ta-ki (born 2005), Japanese contestant in the K-pop survival show I-Land

== Characters ==
- Taki (Soulcalibur), a fictional female ninja
- Taki Matsuya, a comic book character in the Marvel comics universe
- Taki Reizen from Maiden Rose
- Taki Shiina (椎名 立希), a fictional character in the musical media franchise BanG Dream! and the spin-off anime series BanG Dream! It's MyGO!!!!!

== Places ==
- Taki, India, a town in West Bengal
- Taki, Iran, a village in Gilan province
- Taki, Mie, a town in Japan

== Music ==
- "Taki" (song), a song by Sarah Toscano from the 2025 album, Met Gala

== Other uses ==
- Taki, another name for the Maori wero challenge
- Taki (card game), similar to UNO

== See also ==
- Taqi (disambiguation)
- Takis (disambiguation)
- Taki's Magazine, a political online magazine
- "Taki Ongoy", a 1986 musical work of Argentine composer Victor Heredia
- Taki Taki, a former name of Sranan Tongo, a language of Suriname
- Taki Unquy, a 16th-century movement in the Peruvian Andes
