= Thierry Jamin =

French explorer and pseudohistorian

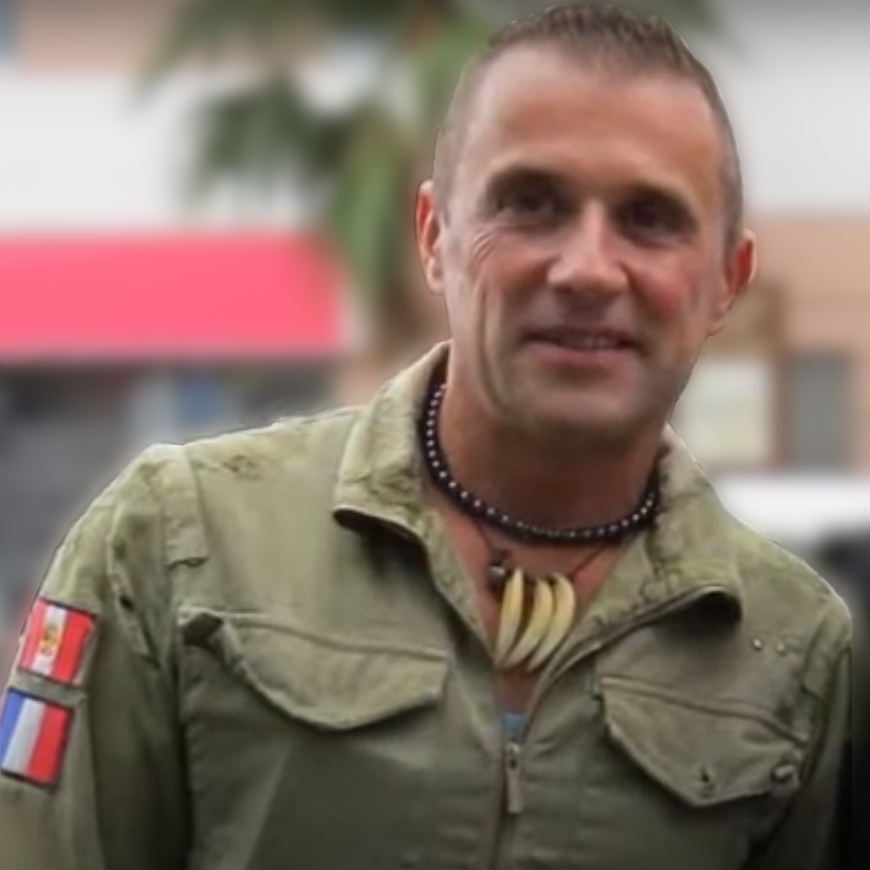
- Thierry Jamin at a conference on his "Alien Project" in Perpignan (France) on 19 October 2017
- Born: 19 December 1967

Thierry Jamin (French: [tieʁi ʒamɛ̃]; born 19 December 1967) is a French explorer and pseudohistorian known for his research about Paititi and the presence of the Incas and pre-Inca civilizations in the Amazonian rainforest.

In 2013, he claimed to have discovered the tomb of the Inca emperor Pachacutec at Machu Picchu. Throughout his crowdfunding campaign in 2017, he claimed to have discovered mummies, which he presented as potential biological relics of an unknown species, possibly of extraterrestrial origin.

None of his claims of discoveries have been validated by the scientific community. They have drawn increasing criticism for their methodological flaws, first in 2013 from Peruvian archaeological authorities, who notably denounced his claims and warned of the dangers of excavation ventures for Peru's cultural heritage, and then from international research groups in 2017 and 2023.

== In search of Paititi and Inca presence ==
In 2001, Jamin reached the site of Pantiacolla. The pyramids are natural formations but Jamin said he had found some Inca artefacts in the same area. At the site of Pusharo he stated that some of the petroglyphs are only visible at a certain moment of the day.

In July 2006, Jamin returned to the area of the Pyramids of Pantiacolla. He then returned to Pusharo and studied the petroglyphs. His assumption is that the ancient rock site could be an ancient road map leading to a major archaeological site. In the area of Pusharo, he also said he had discovered geoglyphs that are similar to the Nazca lines. According to Jamin, this evidence demonstrated an Inca presence in this area.

In 2009, with the help of the French television channel TF1, the city of Toulouse, and private partners, Jamin studied the site of Mameria. A few weeks later, Jamin started a new exploration campaign in the Valley of Lacco. He contributed to the valorization of sites like the fortress of Hualla Mocco (area Hualla), and the small cities of Torre Mocco and of Lukma Kancha (area Quinuay). He also contributed to valorize the small cities of Patan Marka and Llaqtapata (area Juy Huay), the ceremonial site of P'ukru (area Mesapata). In the area of Qurimayu, he studied another city, also called Llaqtapata, and composed of about 150 buildings, a dozen streets, and two main squares.

In 2010, Jamin returned to the valleys of Lacco and Chunchusmayu and discovered several archaeological sites. There he explored new areas and studied the ruins of Inka Tampu and the third Llaqtapata. After further investigations at Monte Punku, he returned to Lacco where he studied the citadels of Pantipayana (area Rataratayuq), Apucatina (area Pallamiyuq), Inka Raqay (area Qurimayu), Chawpichullu (area Chawpichullu), Hatun Monte (area Juy Huay) and Puma Qucha (Juy Huay).

== Door in Machu Picchu ==
In August 2011, Jamin was contacted by David Crespy, a French engineer from Barcelona, Spain. A year before, while visiting Machu Picchu, he noticed what looked like a 'hidden door' located at the bottom of one of the main buildings. After visiting the site, Jamin, confirmed the existence of a door. On December 19, 2011, he submitted a research project with the objective to use ground-penetrating radar technologies to determine if some cavities were located behind the door, which was approved by the Peruvian Ministry of Culture. Jamin's team investigated the site in March 2012.

Jamin led the investigating team composed of Peruvian archaeologist Hilbert Sumire Bustincio, Spanish archeologist Daniel Ángel Merino Panizo, and Peruvian architect and conservation specialist Víctor Armando Pimentel Gurmendi, With the help of several technologies, they were able to detect the presence of cavities and the possibility of archaeological material. Based on the results of the non-invasive techniques used by Jamin's team, one of their assumptions was that the site could be the burial tomb of Pachacutec.

On May 22, 2012, Jamin submitted a new project proposal to the Ministry of Culture to open the door. In November 2012, the regional Directorate of Culture of Cusco denied the authorization to excavate the site. In February 2013, governing body, along with the Direction of Machu Picchu Archaeological Park, strongly criticized the lack of scientific rigor and methodology of his project and assumptions. As per February 2013, the Ministry of Culture from Lima had not made any decision and negotiations were ongoing. Jamin hoped for a new study conducted by a third party.

Shortly after his project was rejected, Jamin claimed to have received anonymous death threats by mail, and threatened to sue the Regional Directorate of Culture of Cusco for having declared him a tomb robber.

== The Alien Project ==
In January 2017, Thierry Jamin announced on the internet that supposed "mummified bodies and organs" had been discovered in southern Peru in January 2016, that he had been able to obtain some of them, and that he interpreted them as possible "biological relics belonging to unknown terrestrial species or species from outside our planet." On behalf of the Inkari Cusco Institute, he organized a fundraiser on the participatory financing website Ulule, on March 12, 2017. He collected 39,510€ with the aim of "carrying out in various laboratories of international renown the complete analyses" of these "materials." According to Thierry Jamin's website, the "biological material samples" were delivered to three laboratories on May 3, 2017.

On July 11, 2017, a conference took place at Lima's Swiss Hotel, presented by ufologist Jaime Maussan, with José de la Cruz Rios, and José de Jesús Zalce Benítez, which revealed nothing new or specific. Simultaneously, Thierry Jamin, who had previously announced that he would attend the Swiss Hotel conference, exhibited live on YouTube the results of his own analyses, asserting that while some samples showed signs of artificial modification by humans, further investigation was necessary to form rigorous conclusions.

=== Reactions ===
On June 28, 2017, Professor Rodolfo Salas-Gismondi of the Division of Paleontology at the American Museum of Natural History in New York denounced the scientific sham represented by the so-called "alien mummy of Nasca". He also appeared in a report of the French magazine 66 minutes broadcast on the M6 channel on 28 January 2018, in which he stated that the mummies were probably an assemblage of animal skeletal remains, and that no evidence had been provided to support the hypothesis that they were the skeletons of an unknown species of extraterrestrial origin.

On 8 July 2017, a group of twelve Peruvian and international bio-anthropologists (specialists in the study and conservation of human remains, including mummies) issued a statement through the World Congress on Mummy Studies denouncing the fraud of "extraterrestrial mummies." It stated that these productions are "undoubtedly human remains pre-Columbians [...] manipulated and even mutilated to obtain an 'ad hoc' appearance for commercial exploitation". The press release went on to denounce the authors of these productions and those exploiting them, calling these practices "criminal abuse" that "violates human dignity in a profound way," as well as "numerous national and international norms that watch for the defense of Cultural Heritage."

On July 13, 2017, American archaeologist Carl Feagans concluded that it was a "hoax."

On August 3, 2017, anthropology professors John Hoopes and Jennifer Raff of the University of Kansas called the project pseudoscientific and denounced its lack of respect for indigenous peoples.

On October 28, 2019, the Ministry of Culture of the Republic of Peru demanded that the National University San Luis Gonzaga de Ica (controversial) to hand over to the Peruvian state the "fake alien mummies" described as "human remains", explaining that "during the two visits, SDC Ica staff were unable to enter the site where the remains are located, the first time due to the absence of the Vice-Rector for Research, and the second time by decision of the Vice-Rector, despite his own invitation, who proposed scheduling the visit to take photos of the presumed archaeological remains for November 5 this year".

On 13 September 2023, at a session of the Mexican Congress devoted to UFOs, journalist and ufologist Jaime Maussan presented the specimens as potential evidence of non-human life forms.

This presentation was criticized by many experts as a hoax denied by the scientific community; Julieta Norma Fierro Gossman, a physics researcher at UNAM, said the university had not reached the conclusions attributed to it by Maussan and that the analysis presented by Maussan made no sense scientifically. UNAM further republished its September 2017 statement, clarifying that it had drawn no conclusions as to the origin of a sample sent to it for Carbon-14 analysis and that it had not carried out any other type of analysis. Wired summarized these reactions by stating that the scientific consensus was unanimous regarding the fact that the mummies presented by Maussan were in reality a counterfeit archaeological artifact, citing in particular the conclusions of Flavio Estrada, forensic archaeologist who analyzed the mummies for the Institute of Forensic Medicine and Forensic Sciences of the Public Ministry of Peru, that the remains of the alleged extraterrestrials are creations made of animal and human bones held together with synthetic glue, which have been covered with fake skin.

On 7 November 2023, at a second session of the Mexican UFO Congress, Thierry Jamin (introduced as Thierre Maurice Pierre, researcher at Institut Inkari), joined Jaime Maussan and a group of Peruvian doctors to assert that the specimens were not artificial fakes but were once-living bodies.

== Publications ==
Books and publications written by Jamin include:

- Jamin, Thierry (July–August 2010). "Jeu de piste chez les Incas". Historia (in French) (126). Archived from the original on 26 January 2012.
- Jamin, Thierry (November 2007). Pusharo, la memoria recobrada de los Incas (in Spanish). Lima: Edisa. ISBN 9789972335662.
- Jamin, Thierry & Ruquier, Pierre-Albert (2006). L'Eldorado Inca : A la recherche de Païtiti (in French). Paris: Hugo & Compagnie. ISBN 978-2755600988.

== See also ==
- Paititi
- Pusharo
- Mameria
- Jaime Maussan
