= Jamin =

Jamin may refer to:

== Bible ==
- Jamin (biblical figure), any of three different Biblical figures

== People ==
=== Given name ===
- Jamin Davis (born 1998), American football player
- Jamin Elliott (born 1979), American football player
- Jamin Olivencia (born 1985), American professional wrestler
- Jamin Pugh (1984–2023), American professional wrestler
- Jamin Raskin (born 1962) American politician
- Jamin Ruhren (born 1977), American drag queen
- Jamin Winans (born 1977), American filmmaker, writer, and composer

=== Surname ===
- Hanniel Jamin (born 1994), Ghanaian beauty pageant titleholder
- Jules Jamin (1818–1886), French physicist
- Jules Crépieux-Jamin (1859–1940), French graphologist
- Michael Jamin (b. 1970), American TV writer and producer
- Paul Jamin (1853–1903), French painter
- Pierre Jamin (born 1987), French footballer
- Thierry Jamin (born 1967), French explorer and historian

== Geography ==
- Jamin, Iran, a village in Kermanshah Province, Iran
- Jamin (Arunachal Pradesh), a city in the state of Arunachal Pradesh, India

== See also ==
- Jamin interferometer, device invented by physicist Jules Jamin
