= Dimopoulos =

Dimopoulos or Demopoulos (Greek: Δημόπουλος) is a Greek surname. The prefix "Δήμ(ος)" can be a shortened version of "Demosthenes" (derived from the Greek for 'strength of the people'), or "Dimitrios" (derived from the ancient Greek goddess Demeter), whilst the suffix "όπουλος" means "son of". This surname may refer to:

- Christos Dimopoulos (born 1958), Greek former football player
- Dean Demopoulos (born 1954), American collegiate and professional basketball coach
- Dinos Dimopoulos (1921–2003), Greek actor, film director, screenwriter and theatre director
- Harry Demopoulos, American medical researcher
- Konstantin Dimopoulos (born 1954), New Zealand sculptor and performance artist
- Santa Dimopoulos, Ukrainian singer
- Savas Dimopoulos (born 1952), Greek physicist
- Stergios Dimopoulos (born 1990), Greek football defender
- Steve Dimopoulos (born 1972), Australian politician
- Takis Dimopoulos (1898–1981), Greek essayist, novelist and philologist
- Thanasis Dimopoulos (born 1963) Greek former football player
