= Takis (name) =

Takis is a given name and nickname. People with the name include:

== Given name ==
- Takis Christoforidis (1914–1973), Greek actor
- Takis Diamantopoulos (b. 1949), Greek photographer
- Takis Dimopoulos (1898–1981), Greek essayist, novelist and philologist
- Takis Emmanuel, Greek–Australian actor
- Takis Evdokas (1928–2020), Greek Cypriot politician
- Takis Fotopoulos (b. 1940), Greek political philosopher
- Takis Fyssas (b. 1973), Greek former professional footballer
- Takis Hadjigeorgiou (b. 1956), Cypriot politician
- Takis Kanellopoulos (1933–1990), Greek film director
- Takis Mehmet Ali (b. 1991), German politician
- Takis Mousafiris, Greek Aromanian composer and songwriter
- Takis Würger (b. 1985), German journalist and writer

== Nickname ==
- Takis Gonias (b. 1971), Greek football manager
- Takis Ikonomopoulos (1943–2025), Greek professional footballer
- Takis Karagiozopoulos (b. 1961), Greek former professional footballer
- Takis Karatzoulidis (b. 1957), Greek former professional basketball player and coach
- Takis Mavris (b. 1956), Cypriot football player
- Takis Nikoloudis (b. 1951), Greek former professional footballer
- Panayiotis Vassilakis (1925–2019), known as "Takis", Greek sculptor

== See also ==
- Taki (disambiguation)
