= Q'ero =

Quechua-speaking community

Q'iru
- A spiritual tour guide (to the left) with four Hatun Q'ero people

Regions with significant populations
- Peru

Languages
- Cusco–Collao Quechua, Spanish

Religion
- Catholicism, Traditional Andean religions, Evangelicalism

Related ethnic groups
- Quechuas

Q'ero (spelled Q'iru in the official three-vowel Quechua orthography) are a Quechua-speaking community or ethnic group dwelling in the province of Paucartambo, in the Cusco Region of Peru.

The Q'ero became more widely known due to the 1955 ethnological expedition of Dr. Oscar Nuñez del Prado of the San Antonio Abad National University in Cusco, after which the myth of the Inkarrí was published for the first time. Nuñez del Prado first met the Q'ero at a festival in the town of Paucartambo, about 120 km away.

== Geography and history ==
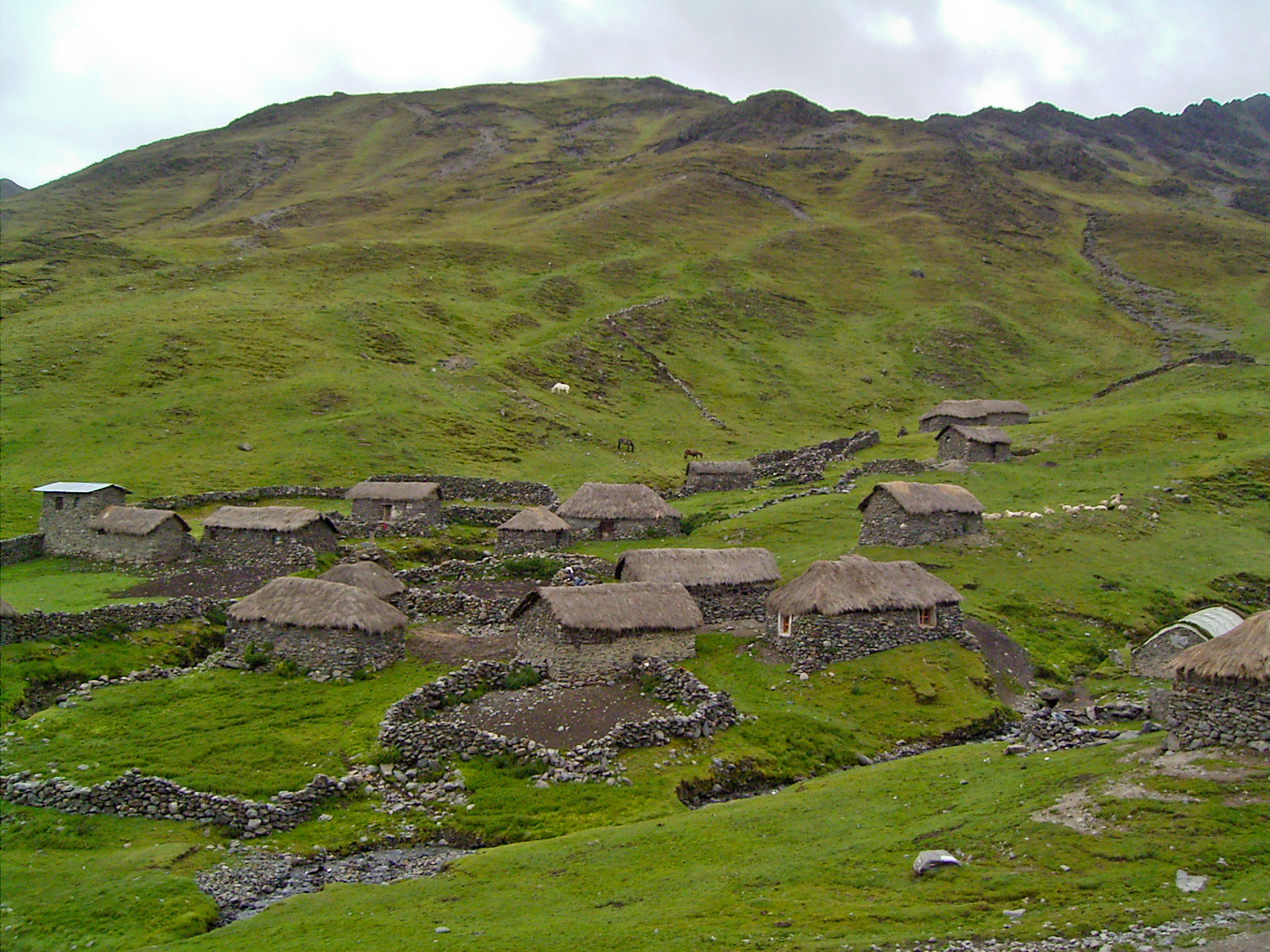
A Q'ero village (February 2007)

The Q'ero live in one of the most remote places in the Peruvian Andes. Nevertheless, they were incorporated into the Yabar hacienda, located outside of Paucartambo. With the assistance of advocates from outside of the communities, the hacienda's owners were banished in 1963, and since then the whole area has belonged to the Q'ero. The ground is not very fertile, and the Q'ero live in modest dwellings. They often live in one-room houses not larger than 20 m^{2}, made of clay and natural stone with roofs of hard grass. The area stretches over several climates, with elevations from under 1800 m to over 4500 m. Depending on the climatic zone, maize (corn) and potatoes may be grown, while in high areas llamas are kept. Fields are plowed with a type of foot-plow (chaki taklla).

According to the 10-year census taken by the private U.S. Vanishing Cultures Foundation Inc, there are six major Q'ero villages, which are home for 600 people and approximately 6000 llamas and alpacas. The travel-time on the mountain trails between villages ranges from only an hour up to a full three-days of travel. The two villages Hatun Q'ero and Hapu Q'ero are located above 4000 m in elevation and about a day's walk away from each other. The lower areas of the community are inhabited seasonally, in order to till the fields; accordingly, the housing there consists of temporary huts made of clay and branches (chuklla).

Over the past ten years, dozens of Peruvian and international NGOs have engaged with the Q'ero in efforts to improve education, health, access to potable water and electricity, and to preserve their cultural heritage. The success of these projects varies.

== History, myths, and beliefs ==
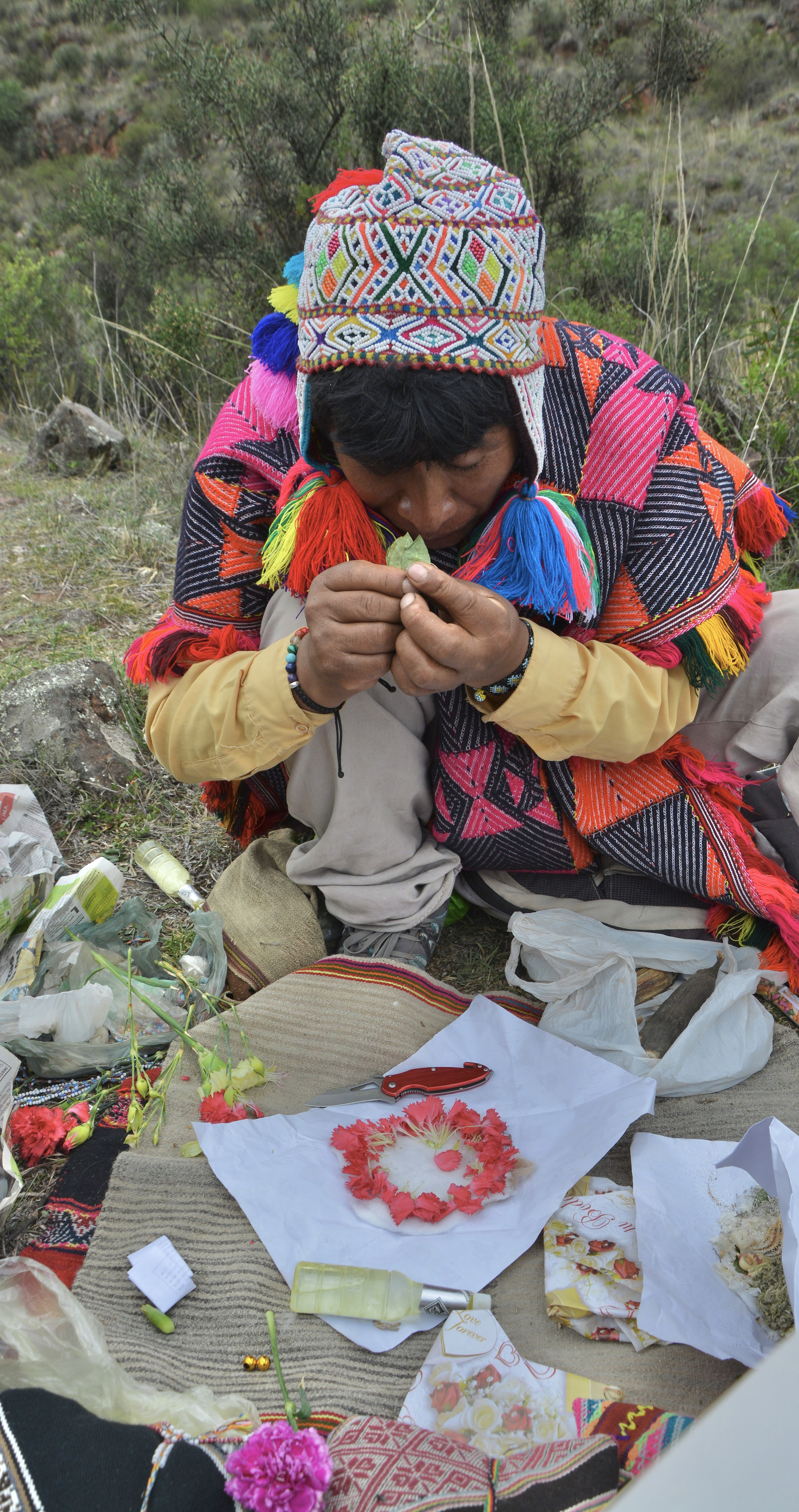
A paqo.

The Q'ero practice an active tradition of oral literature, with stories being passed down from generation to generation. Some Cusco anthropologists and spiritual pilgrims believe that the Q'ero are the direct descendants of the Inca. According to Q'ero mythology, their ancestors defended themselves from invading Spanish conquistadores with the aid of local mountain deities (apu) that devastated the Spanish Army near Wiraquchapampa by creating an earthquake and subsequent rockslide that buried the Spanish invaders.

The Q'ero do not practice any particular religion, though they are highly spiritual. Their beliefs are not dogmatic like those of many organized religions. Some of the Q'ero have been converted to Christianity by a wide variety of missionaries that have visited their homeland. Some may argue that their beliefs are syncretic, consisting of the traditional spiritual beliefs of Andean peoples with a small mixture of Christianity. The Q’ero have both mystical and shamanic traditions. They call their spiritual leaders paqos, a term that may be translated as 'priest' or 'practitioner'. A major distinction between mystics and shamans is that shamans enter a trance state which is induced by either a medicinal plant, dancing, drumming, meditation, or some other type of transformational activity that allows the practitioner to transcend into a trance-like state in order to heal or diagnose disease. Among the Q'ero, there are two main levels of paqos: altumisayuq and pampamisayuq. The Q'ero worship the "Cosmic Mother", Pachamama, which may mean the entire universe or, as some would say, Mother Nature, in addition to other mountain spirits, called apus, e.g. Ausangate (Apu Awsanqati), Salkantai (Apu Salkantai).

Current research on shamanic practices is conducted by anthropologist Anna Przytomska from Adam Mickiewicz University, who has written that the relationship between apu and humans is based on two main schemes: predation and reciprocity.

During the first age (Ñawpa Pacha), the time of the first men (Ñawpa Machu), only the moon existed (Killa). Within the first big turning point of history the sun (Inti a.k.a. Wayna Qhapaq, young sovereign) appeared and dried out the Ñawpa Machu. The king Inca (Inkarri) was the son of the sun and father of the Inca and therefore ancestor of the Q'eros. When Inkarri founded the city Qusqu (Cusco) by throwing a golden rod he also created Jesus Christ. The current age (Kay Pacha) was initiated by the arrival of the Spanish and the violent death of Inkarri who afterwards raptured to the sanctuary Paititi. The time of the Incas is often referred to as the Kay Pacha which is also the age of the sun (Inti). This age will end with another Pachakutiy when Inkarri returns converting everything into gold and silver (Taripay Pacha). The sun will burn the world with bad people while good people will ascend to heaven (Hanaq Pacha). The return of the Inkarri is expected soon; a testimony of his mounting is for example the banishing of the Hacendados which so it is said were very cruel.

Organized religion is not a part of Q'ero society. The Q'ero say they live in balance and respect for all living things, through ayni (reciprocity, mutualism). The Q'ero practice ayni with individuals, their family, neighbors and community. It is based on the idea of always giving and knowing that in the end you yourself will receive. Ayni is also practiced with the spirit word and this puts one into right relationship and harmony with all living things, including nature, the environment and the spirit world. The spirit of life around them is what they respect and honor. They understand the balance of nature, its power and beauty, otherwise they could not exist in such a harsh and difficult environment.

There are very few true medicine people still existing in the villages, the traditions are being lost due to the lack of interest among the youth. They respect and honor Mother Nature (Pachamama) as well as other mountain spirits, called apus, e.g. Ausangate (Apu Awsanqati), Salkantay (Apu Salkantai).

There are many myths surrounding the Q'ero. They are simple farmers and magnificent weavers, but the myths stem from their spiritual beliefs. Many of the stories being told are exaggerations. One hears frequently amongst spiritual pilgrims that the Q'ero are bloodline descendants of the Inca high priests and that they live at altitudes exceeding 18,000 feet. There is no proof to suggest that the Q'ero are bloodline descendants of the Inca let alone specifically the high priests. There is evidence that suggests that the Q'ero may have in fact been part of the Inca empire as their weaving style can be traced back to Inca like patterns. Anthropologist Juan Nunez Del Prado also talks about their belief system in Jungian terms in which he says their tradition teaches that anyone can have "the seed of an Inca". The seed is a metaphor for being an enlightened individual. The Q'ero typically do not live above 14,000 feet. While some huts exist at higher altitudes and are used if someone is trapped in bad weather, most villages are at lower altitudes.

== Language ==
All age groups speak Quechua, specifically the Qusqu-Qullaw dialect, albeit with considerable influence from Spanish language in vocabulary and syntax. Spanish is taught in schools, so young Q'ero people are likely to speak Spanish, especially in Hapu Q'ero. Because travel to the villages has been so difficult and the living conditions are so harsh, it has been difficult to maintain education in the Q'ero villages. For schooling, the young people must travel to towns or cities at lower elevations to learn Spanish or be taught by family members who have already traveled and live there.

== Music ==
Q'eros' songs are basically used for animal fertility rituals and in carnival. Each animal type has its own ritual in the yearly cycle, as well as its own song. Carnival songs are generally about medicinal and sacred plants, flowers, and birds, along with other topics. There is one harvest song about the corn harvest, which is in decline since the Q'eros do not descend regularly for their corn harvest as in previous years, and there is also a body of songs that are only remembered by the older generation. The music is communal, that is, all women sing and all men play the pinkuyllu flute, or the panpipe known as qanchis sipas. A common aesthetic is that the singing and playing be continuous, since the music is an offering to the mountain gods and mother earth and the offerings must not stop during ritual. The resultant texture is a dense heterophonic overlap. Each man makes his own pinkuyllu flute from bamboo from the Q'eros' cloud forest, gathered traditionally before carnival time. Not one pinkuyllu is tuned to another, yet it will be tuned to itself to render 3 notes. The women also sing in a tritonic scale. The overall sound is wonderful, dense dissonance, since many pinkuyllus are playing at once but not in a single, unified key, and the women often sing in varying keys as well. The ends of verses have a long-held drone, with full exhalation of breath at the end.

"The general Q’ero musical aesthetics allows different pitches, texts, and rhythms to sound at the same time. Though the Q’ero sometimes sing in perfect unison, their songs are structures to be sung individually. There is no sense of choral singing or harmony. A family, ayllu, or community may be singing and playing the same songs at the point of starting and stopping. Yet the melodies sung at communal occasions have a sustained note at the end of a phrase, permitting the other singers to catch up and share this prolonged duration, which serves as a drone. When the new verse starts, the heterophony begins anew".

The most comprehensive work about Q'eros' music is Holly Wissler's From Grief and Joy We Sing: Social and Cosmic Regenerative Processes in the Songs of the Q'eros, Peru (2009). A shorter informative article about Q'eros music is John Cohen and Holly Wissler's "Q’eros" in The Garland Handbook of Latin American Music (2008).

== Films about the Q'ero ==
Q'ero Mystics of Peru
Q'ero Mystics of Peru (2014) is a feature-length documentary from filmmaker Seti Gershberg, who worked with the Q'ero for two years in Peru. It is the first installment in a two-part documentary series called The Path of the Sun. Topics discussed in the series include mysticism, consciousness, and the medicinal plant ayahuasca. Q'ero Mystics of Peru is a work of visual anthropology. The film contains interviews with a number of Q'ero, including Pampamisayuq's Don Humberto Soncco, Dona Bernadina Apassa, Guillermo and Rolando Soncco, Don Andres Flores, and Santos Quispe (grandson of Altumisayuq, Don Manuel Quispe). Interviewees in the film include Juan Nuñez del Prado, an anthropologist and son of anthropologist Oscar Nuñez del Prado, who led the expedition to Q'eros in 1955; Elizabeth B. Jenkins, author of several books about the Q'ero; Dr. Holly Wissler, an ethnomusicologist who lived with the Q'ero while researching her dissertation on Q'ero music; and Joan Parisi Wilcox, author of Masters of the Living Energy (2004), a book about the Q'ero based on interviews conducted with community leaders.
Humano
Humano (2013) is a journey driven by a young man’s two hundred questions, which will end up exposing an unknown world both for him, and for the whole of humanity. The true origin of men, and what it means to be human, today remain a mystery. Would the inhabitants of the Andes have the key to reveal this still hidden secret? Filmmaker Alan Stivelman asks these questions of Q'ero Pampamisayuq Nicolas Paucar who he travels with on an expedition of discovery into the beliefs and ideas of the Q'ero.
Inkarri, 500 Years of Resistance of the Incas Spirit in Peru
Before José Huamán Turpo released this film in 2012, for ten years he filmed Q'ero communities—especially Hatun Q'ero and its hamlets. It documents the people's oral histories in their own voices, and includes footage of rituals rarely seen by outsiders. Video distributions of the film have subtitles in English, French, German, and Spanish.
Kusisqa Waqashayku: From Grief and Joy We Sing
A 2007 documentary by Holly Wissler, who holds a doctorate in ethnomusicology. This 53-minute independent production has soundtracks in English, Spanish and Quechua. It was filmed and edited entirely in Q’eros and Cusco, Peru. The DVD includes a booklet with supplementary information in Spanish and English. This video seeks to document Q’eros’ musical rituals for the Q’eros community, to educate a larger audience (Perú and beyond) about Andean musical rituals, and ultimately to promote respect for indigenous cultures. It shows how the Q'eros use music for their expression of grief and loss.
Q'ero: In Search of the Last Incas
A short documentary from 1993 by Mo Fini.
Carnival in Q'eros
This 32-minute documentary from 1991 was directed by John Cohen. It shows the carnival celebrations of the Q'ero. The Q'ero culture offers important clues into the Inca past and the roots of Andean cultures. The Q'ero play flutes and sing to their alpacas in a ritual to promote the animals' fertility. The film shows how the music evolves from individual, to family, to ayllu, to community, a structure of spiritual activity distinct from the structure of kinship. The Q'ero sing and play separately from each other, producing a heterophonic sound without rhythmic beat, harmony, or counterpoint—a "chaotic" sound texture that exemplifies a key connection between the culture of the Andes and that of the Amazon jungle. The film also focuses on the protracted negotiations by which the Indians were compensated for their participation in the project.
Patterns from the Past
A very early documentary about the Q'ero was an early PBS NOVA episode in February 1979 which was in NOVA Season 6 Episode 5. This episode was called Patterns from the Past and a brief description can be found on NOVA TV Programs, in which the Q'ero are described as living in the foothills of the Andes mountains living lives "patterned on that of their ancestors thousands of years ago".

== See also ==
- Indigenous peoples in Peru
