= Maussan Televisión =

- Country: Mexico
- Transmitters: see Imagen Televisión's article
- Headquarters: Mexico City

Programming
- Picture format: 1080i HDTV

Ownership
- Owner: Blanco y Negro Televisión S.A. de C.V.
- Key people: Jaime Maussan

History
- Founded: 2025
- Launched: March 30, 2025
- Founder: Grupo Imagen

Links
- Website: maussantelevision.com

Availability

Terrestrial
- Digital terrestrial television (except Reynosa): Channel 3.3 (HD)
- Digital terrestrial television (Reynosa): Channel 13.3 (HD)

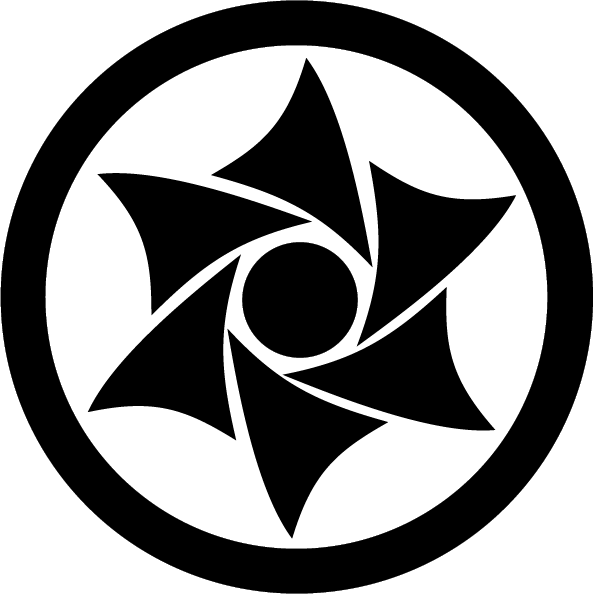

Maussan Televisión is a national broadcast television network in Mexico, founded by Jaime Maussan, and operated by Blanco y Negro Televisión S.A. de C.V. It launched on March 30, 2025, at 9am; by means of a commercial agreement with Grupo Imagen, the channel is carried on the DT3 channels of the national Imagen Televisión multiplexes. The channel's main emphasis is in the topics of UFOlogy, extraterrestrial beings and paranormal subjects.

== History ==
Maussan Televisión made its first posts on social media in December 2024, without specifying further carriage details. The channel was beginning test mode on Imagen's 3.3 subchannel, which had just been activated. The agreement with Imagen was announced by Maussan himself in late February, with a March 30 launch date. The move made Imagen the first national private network to lease one of its subchannels.

The channel broadcasts from premises in the Santa Fe district of Mexico City, within the Garden Santa Fe mall. Three of its studios are entirely digital and it has a 16×4-meter screen, one of the largest installed in Mexico. In a video delivered on social media, he claimed that the channel was "the dream of his life" in his 50-year career.

The channel launched at 9am on March 30, 2025; it also plans launching on cable operators and FAST providers. Its cable launch was on July 9, 2025, on Izzi Telecom.

== Programming ==
Most of its programming is produced in Mexico for the channel, amassing 85% of its output. Original programming caters a wide variety of topics, such as animals (Animales fantásticos, historias extraordinarias), ufology (La agenda secreta, Centinelas, Mi entrevista paranormal, No humano), tourism and ecology (Eco aventuras), life stories (El secreto de la vida, Entre hechizos y realidades, Rescatistas, Sobrevivientes), health (Pregúntale al Dr. Zalce, Homolongevus, Medicina china), astronomy (Misterios del universo), apparitions (Misterios divinos) sports (Órbita Deportiva) as well as live debates on varied topics (Cara a cara, la noche del debate, Mañana estelar). Foreign programming includes Ancient Aliens, Life After People and UFO Hunters, documentaries from the Gaia platform and Celebrity Ghost Stories. Reruns of Maussan Presenta are also aired.

The channel avoids airing "conventional" programming, emphasizing its content on its own schedule. It is also the only commercial television network (aside Canal 5) not to carry news programs.
