= Paititi =

Legendary Inca lost city

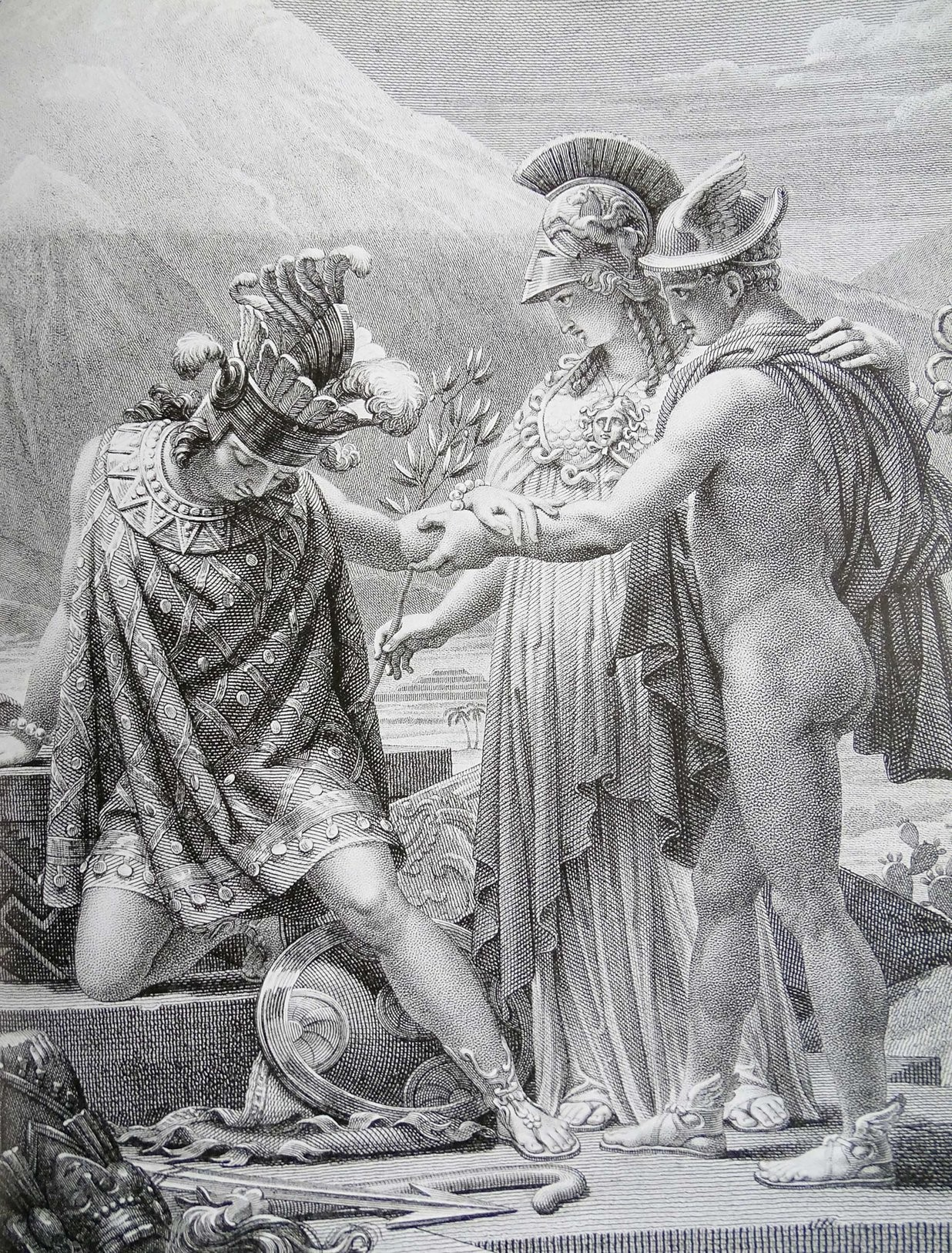
Minerva, together with Mercury, bring Atahualpa out of the tomb.

Paititi is an Incan legendary lost city or utopian rich land. It allegedly lies east of the Andes, hidden somewhere within the remote rainforests of southeast Peru, northern Bolivia or northwest Brazil. The Paititi legend in Peru revolves around the story of Inkarri, an Incan culture-hero, who founded Q'ero and Cusco, and afterwards retreated toward the jungles of Pantiacolla to live out the rest of his days in his refuge city of Paititi. Other versions of the legend see Paititi as an Inca refuge in the border area between Bolivia and Brazil.

== Recent findings ==
In 2001, the Italian archaeologist Mario Polia discovered the report of the missionary Andres Lopez in the archives of the Jesuits in Rome. In the document, which dates from about 1600, Lopez describes a large city rich in gold, silver, and jewels, located in the middle of the tropical jungle called Paititi by the natives. Lopez informed the Pope about his discovery. Lopez's report and its discovery were widely publicized, though its content is third-hand and far from reliable, Lopez himself having never reached Paititi but only having heard about it from the natives. It focuses on the story of a miracle performed at the court of the king of Paititi by a crucifix taken there by a group of baptized Indians. Many other historical sources of the Colonial period (16th to 18th centuries) refer to Paititi, to its possible locations and to expeditions searching for it. Some of the most informative of these documents include those of Juan Álvarez Maldonado (1570), Gregorio Bolívar (1621), Juan Recio de León (1623–27), Juan de Ojeda (1676), Diego de Eguiluz (1696).

In 2001, two researchers from the University of Helsinki, Dr. Ari Siiriäinen (archaeologist) and Dr. Martti Pärssinen (historian), put forward a hypothesis relating the Paititi legend to the Inca expeditions into the Amazonian jungle and to the possible Inca military presence in the region of the Beni and the Madre de Dios rivers. In order to test this hypothesis, a joint Finnish-Bolivian archaeological expedition in 2001–2003 investigated the fortified site Las Piedras near the town of Riberalta in Eastern Bolivia. Some fragments of imperial Inca ceramics were found during the excavations, but the presumed Inca origin of the site remains questionable.

Historian and anthropologist Vera Tyuleneva has contributed to the idea of the non-Peruvian origin of the name "Paititi" and its original locale; she has made expeditions to northern Bolivia and provided extensive and detailed written reports on her findings.

On 29 December 2007, members of a local community near Kimbiri, Peru, found large stone structures resembling high walls, covering an area of 40,000 square meters; they named it the Manco Pata fortress. Researchers from the Peruvian government's Cusco-based National Institute of Culture (INC), however, disputed suggestions by the local mayor that it could be part of the lost city of Paititi. Their report identified the stone structures as naturally formed sandstone. In 2008, the municipality of Kimbiri decided to promote it as a tourist destination.

Recent historical work by the explorer Andrew Nicol examined primary historical texts and concluded that a jungle city or remote Inca outpost, such as the city described by the Paititi legend, could theoretically exist within the Peruvian Amazon Basin. Nicol references the existence of the sites of Vilcabamba, Peru and Mameria as the chief sources of evidence supporting this theory. Parts of this region discussed in Nicols' research are referred to as Antisuyu, one of the four regions into which the Inca empire was divided.

== Expeditions in search of Paititi during the past 100 years ==
- 1925: Percy Harrison Fawcett (Mato Grosso, Brasil).
- 1954 to 1955: Hans Ertl (Bolivia)
- 1958 to 2003: Peruvian explorer Carlos Neuenschwander Landa led multiple expeditions in search of Paititi, in the Madre de Dios region and Cusco region.
- 1971: A French-American expedition led by Bob Nichols, Serge Debru, and Georges Puel travelled up the Rio Pantiacolla from Shintuya in search of Paititi. The party's guides left after a 30-day agreement expired, and though the three continued on, they never returned. Japanese explorer Yoshiharu Sekino contacted Machiguenga Indians in the area the following year and confirmed that the expedition members had been killed.
- 1984 to 2011: various expeditions led by Gregory Deyermenjian, member of The Explorers Club. These included the documentation of Incan remains in Mameria, the exploration and documentation of the petroglyphs at Pusharo, exploration and documentation of Manu's Pyramids of Paratoari, and others
- 1997: Lars Hafskjold set out from Puerto Maldonado, Madre de Dios, Peru. He disappeared somewhere in the unexplored parts of Bolivia.
- 1998 to 1999: G Cope Schellhorn, Santiago Yábar discovered petroglyphs in the Paratoari Pyramids area.
- In June 2001, the Kota Mama II expedition led by John Blashford-Snell located some significant ancient ruins in the jungle east of Lake Titicaca in Bolivia that are believed to be identical to those discovered earlier by Hans Ertl.
- 2001: Thierry Jamin investigates the site of Pantiacolla. The pyramids are in fact natural formations but Jamin discovered several Inca artefacts in the same area.
- 2002: Jacek Pałkiewicz undertook an expedition.
- The June 2004 "Quest for Paititi" exploration team of Deyermenjian and Mamani discovered several important Inca ruins along branches of the Inca Road of Stone at the peak known as Último Punto in the northern part of the Pantiacolla region of Peru.
- 2005: The French explorer Thierry Jamin and the French-Peruvian Herbert Cartagena studied Pusharo petroglyphs and reported to have seen large geoglyphs in a valley nearby. They thought they might have found a "map" showing where Paititi might be located. Further expeditions were set up in the following years.
- 2009 to 2010: Olly Steeds looks for Paititi while filming Solving History with Olly Steeds in the episode "Lost City of Gold".
- 2009 to 2011: various expeditions by Italian researcher Yuri Leveratto. He reached one of the Pyramids of Pantiacolla (or Paratoari).
- 2011: British expedition to investigate the Pyramids of Paratoari with Kenneth Gawne, Lewis Knight, Ken Halfpenny, I. Gardiner and Darwin Moscoso as part of a documentary.
- 2014: Josh Gates looks for Paititi while filming Expedition Unknown.
- 2019 to 2023: Virgilio Yábar discovered ruins, petroglyphs and geoglyphs, in the Paratoari pyramids complex.

== Paititi in popular culture ==
- The expeditions to find Paititi inspired Sir Arthur Conan Doyle's novel The Lost World
- The 2012 film Tad, The Lost Explorer is an animated adventure with characters who travel to Peru in search of Paititi.
- The 2018 video game Shadow of the Tomb Raider features Paititi as a key locale hosting artifacts hunted by Lara Croft. It also mentions Lopez, Fawcett and others.
- In the 2016 game Sid Meier's Civilization VI, Paititi makes an appearance as a Natural Wonder in the 2020 Maya and Gran Colombia Pack DLC included in the New Frontier Pass.
- In the 2021 book Charlie Thorne and the Lost City by Stuart Gibbs, Charlie and company discover a lost city that they speculate is Paititi.

== See also ==
- Akakor
- City of the Caesars
- El Dorado
- Kuhikugu
- La Canela
- List of mythological places
- Lost city
- Lost City of Z
- Manuscript 512
- Quivira
- Ratanabá
- Seven Cities of Gold
- Sierra de la Plata

== Partial bibliography ==
- Andrew Nicol (2010). "Legends and New Research about Paititi, Peru's Lost City of Gold". Living in Peru.
- Andrew Nicol (2010). "Peru: The Trail to Paititi ". South American Explorers Magazine (94)
- Andrew Nicol (2009). "Paititi: The Last Secret Of The Incas?. A Critical Analysis Of The Legends Surrounding The Lost Inca City Of Gold.". International Journal of South American Archaeology (5)
- Fernando Aparicio Bueno (1998). Paititi: Secret of El Dorado Legend.
- Gregory Deyermenjian (1999). "Glimmers of Paititi". Mercator's World. 4 (1). Archived from the original on June 30, 2003.
- Gregory Deyermenjian (2000). "The Petroglyphs of Pusharo: Peru's Amazonian Riddle". Athena Review. 2 (3). Archived from the original on 2009-04-27.
- Gregory Deyermenjian (1999). "On the Trail of Legends: Searching for Ancient Ruins East of the Andes". GPS World. 10 (6): 20–29.
- Gregory Deyermenjian (1990). "The 1989 Toporake/Paititi Expedition: On the Trail of the Ultimate Refuge of the Incas". The Explorers Journal. 68 (2): 74–83.
- Gregory Deyermenjian (2006). "In Search of Paititi: Following the Road of Stone into an Unknown Peru". The Explorers Journal. 84 (1): 28–35.
- John Blashford-Snell and Richard Snailham (2003). East to the Amazon. London: John Murray. ISBN 0-7195-6504-9.
- Jamin, Thierry & Ruquier, Pierre-Albert (2006). L'Eldorado Inca : A la recherche de Païtiti (in French). Paris: Hugo & Compagnie. ISBN 978-2-7556-0098-8.
- Jamin, Thierry (November 2007). Pusharo, la memoria recobrada de los Incas (in Spanish). Lima, Peru: Edisa. ISBN 978-9972-33566-2. OCLC 213862634.
- Tahir Shah (2004). House of the Tiger King: A Jungle Obsession. London: John Murray. ISBN 978-0-7195-6611-0.
