= Taki Unquy =

16th century indigenous movement in the Peruvian Andes

Taki Unquy (Quechua, Hispanicized and alternative spellings Taqui Ongoy, Taki Oncoy, Taqui Honcoy, Taqui Onccoy, Taki Onqoy) was a millenarian Indigenous movement of political, religious and cultural dimensions which arose in the Peruvian Andes during the 16th century (c. 1564 - c. 1572) in opposition to the recent Spanish arrival.

== Historical background ==
The literal translation of Taki Unquy from Quechua is "sickness of the chant" or "dancing sickness". The intrinsic Andean connotation is difficult to translate.

The name comes from the Andeans contemporary to the Conquista, who believed that the wak'as were annoyed by the expansion of Christianity. The wak'as, Andean spirits, began taking possession of the Indigenous people, making them dance to music and announce divine will to restore the pre-Hispanic culture, mythology and politics.

Taki Unquy arose in the 1560s in Huamanga, Ayacucho, Peru, from where it spread to Huancavelica, Lima, Cusco, Arequipa, Chuquisaca, and La Paz. At the outset the movement was called "The revolt of the Wak'as", which promulgated the rejection of the Christian god that had been imposed by way of violent coercion during Spanish conquest. Furthermore, the movement promoted the return to worship of the huacas, which are dually the pre-Hispanic gods and the grounds in which their worship was practiced.

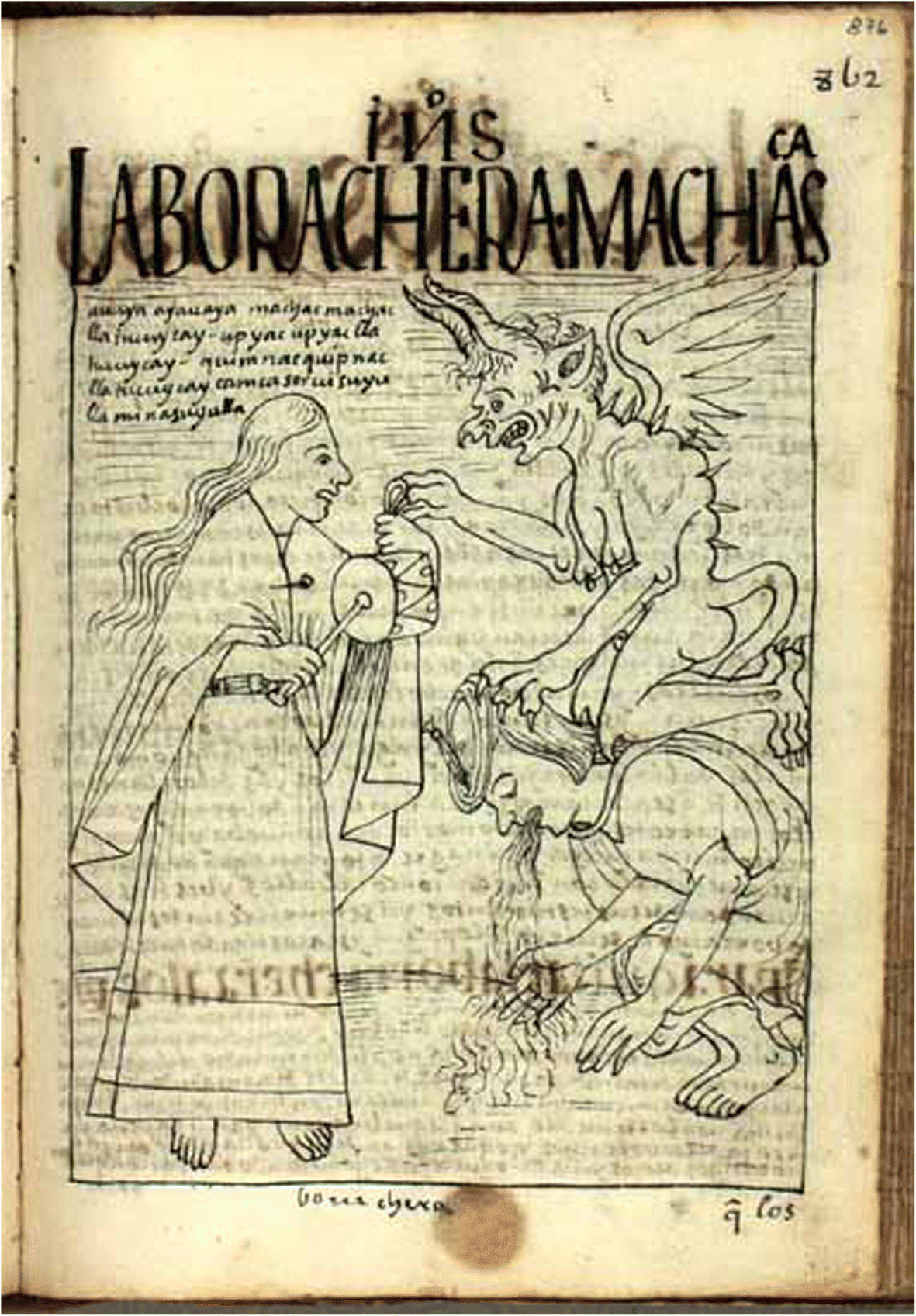
Drawing depicting "La Borachera, Machasca," by Guamán Poma possibly referring to Taki Onqoy. The woman in the text is scolding the Devil, who has possessed the man drinking heavily. The Quechua text reads "Auaya ayauaya! Machac, machaclla. Tucuy cay upyac, upyaclla. Tucuy cay quimnac, quipnaclla. Tucuy cay camca serui, suyulla. Mina suyulla." In English, this translates to "Awaya, ayawaya! The drunk is just a drunk, the drinker just a drinker, the vomiter only vomits. What you do is serve yourself, devil. The mines are where you belong"

=== Religious characteristics ===
According to the new belief, the wak'as' powers were within neither stones nor trees nor lagoons as in time of the Incas, instead they would enter into the bodies of people:

"de los yndios e les hazian hablar e de allí tomaron a temblar diziendo que tenian las guacas en el cuerpo e a muchos dellos tomauan y pintauan los rrostros con color colorada y los ponian en unos cercados e allí yuan los yndios a los adorar por tal guaca y ydoles que dezia que se le avian metido en el cuerpo"

Paraphrased Translation:

"it made the indians talk and then come to a tremble saying that they had the huacas within them and many of them would drink and paint their faces with red color and would then go to enclosures where the indians would worship the huaca or idol that had possessed them "

=== Transformation into political revolt ===
From a rebellion against Christianity, the Taki Unquy devolved rapidly into a political revolt with an ideology in keeping with Andean tradition. It was believed that the huacas would return with all their might and would defeat the Spanish God, as well as the peninsular invaders, re-establishing the equilibrium to a world wracked by the conquest.

=== Repression ===
The visible leader of the movement was an Indian by the name of Juan Chocne. The revolt was harshly suppressed by the official representative of the Spanish Crown, the (visitador) Cristóbal de Albornoz, who collaborated with the future chronicler Felipe Guaman Poma de Ayala. He took Chocne and the other spiritual leaders to Cusco where they were to reject their beliefs in public. The women participants were imprisoned in convents and the Kurakas were fined for their participation in the revolt.

=== Conclusion ===
The movement declined in a few years, it is estimated that the practice ended in 1572, but the hope of a "reconquest" survived in the folklore and in intellectual circles. Bruce Mannheim argues that the fear may have been so strong that fifty years later, when Juan Pérez Bocanegra printed the Quechua hymn "Hanacpachap cussicuinin," he conspicuously avoided the term unquy, though it would fit well into the theme alongside other names of the Pleiades.

== Transcendency and importance of the movement ==
The topic had remained in obscurity for decades, and was reinvigorated by the work of Peruvian historian Luis Millones in 1964. Since that time it has been the subject of revision and analysis, having aided in understanding problems in the contemporaneous Peru, such as the historical process of Andean insurrections against the Spanish. Until that date, it was believed that other movements such as that led by Manco Inca II, Juan Santos Atahualpa, or even the late Tupac Amaru II rebellion, had only political aspects, and the cultural and religious dimensions were not given salience, which the study of Taki Unquy has allowed.

The concept of Taki Unquy transcended the borders of Peru when the Argentine singer/composer Victor Heredia published an album titled Taki Ongoy in 1986.

The playwright, director and actor Hugo Bonnet Rodriguez, born in Azangaro, Puno, crafted a play titled "Taki Onqoy". The play was about the repentance shown by the Andeans after having helped the Spanish destroy the Incas, and their sorrow for the subsequent historical changes. The play may be found in the book by the same name, Taki Onqoy, along with other works by the author.

== See also ==
- Inkarri
- Syncretism
- Ghost Dance

== Bibliography ==
- Doig, F. K. (2002). History and art of ancient Peru. Volume 6, p. 1000. (Uncl. Mentioned report arrives of testimony of Christopher Ximénes On the Taqui Oncoy mentioned in the above-mentioned work).
- Soriano, W. E. (1987). Los Incas. Lima: Amaru.
- del Pino, A. T. (2001). Encyclopedia Ilustrada del Perú. Lima: PEISA.
