= Hanacpachap cussicuinin =

Quechuan (Peru) hymn (early 1600s)

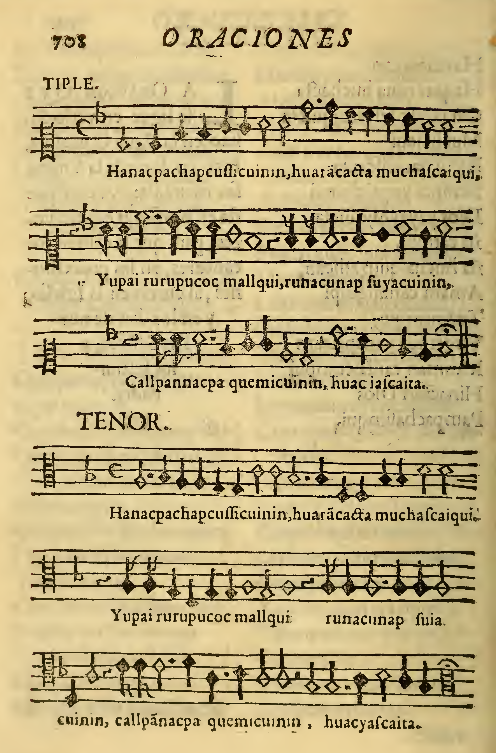
First page of the original edition of "Hanacpachap cussicuinin"

"Hanacpachap cussicuinin" (modern orthography: Hanaq pachap kusikuynin) is a processional hymn to the Virgin Mary in the Quechua language of central Peru, but in a largely European sacred music style. Composed by Juan Pérez de Bocanegra between 1620 and 1631, a third order Franciscan priest, published in 1631 in the Viceroyalty of Peru making it the earliest work of vocal polyphony printed in the New World.

== History ==
Hanacpachap cussicuinin appears for the first time in the Ritual published by a Franciscan tertiary priest Juan Pérez Bocanegra in 1631 entitled Ritual, formulario e institución de curas, written in both Quechua and Spanish, although the hymn itself is in Quechua only without translation. The music is arranged for four voices. When published, the score appeared on pages 708 (tiple, tenor) and 709 (alto, baxo) with the first verse written underneath, while the remaining verses follow on pages 710–712. There are detractors who say that the lack of picardy in the music, for instance, suggests a mistake so basic that someone of Bocanegra's standing would never have made, being an editor of choral works, and have suggested that there may have possibly been another author, or even that it might have been the work of a local native. It could also quite simply have been a transcription error or typesetting omission prior to publishing. On page 707 of the 'Ritual' Bocanegra specifically states "The prayer that follows I did write in Sapphic verse, in the Quechua language, in honour of the Immaculate Virgin: the music is composed for four voices such that cantors may sing it for processions, upon entering into the church, and on days dedicated to Our Lady and on her feast days." Since the entire book contains his name throughout it seems highly unlikely the hymn was written by anyone else other than Bocanegra, who also happened to be the chief examiner of native languages for the Archdiocese of Cuzco.

The piece has been recorded extensively since the early 1990s by groups all over the world (see list below). Many modern performances use only a few of the verses to avoid excessive repetition. However, Ex Cathedra (dir. Jeffrey Skidmore) issued the first full version in 2007, divided into four sections and using varying arrangements. There are 20 verses in total.

== Description ==
Bocanegra identifies the poetic form as 'verso sáfico', or (Sapphic verse), although what he meant by this is unclear. Each verse is made up of five eight-syllable lines and a closing four-syllable phrase, which in the original print copy appeared in italics. Often an epithet, this phrase sometimes links to the next verse. The twenty verses are set strophically.

Musically, it is set for four male voices: treble, alto, tenor and bass in a homorhythmic syllabic style, with a harmonic structure characteristic of Renaissance sacred music. The rhythm, dividing neatly into 3+3+4+3+3+4, with lilting syncopations in bars 7, 11, and 14. Its character is close to that of the cachua, a native dance, suggesting a slow procession. It is considered to be the musical counterpart of the paintings of the Cuzco school.

The lyrics are an ode to the Virgin Mary, containing many metaphors about love and nature grounded in Quechua culture. The epithets given to Mary can be interpreted syncretistically both an orthodox Catholic way and as a continuation of traditional religious practices, with neither interpretation dominant. Surprisingly, two terms relating to the Pleiades are prominent, 'qullqa' and 'qatachillay', while a third, 'unquy', is conspicuously absent. Since the Pleiades symbolized fecundity, a major theme of this song, 'unquy' may have been deliberately avoided to distance the song from those of the Taki Unquy movement.

== Text (first two verses only) ==
Hanacpachap cussicuinin,
Huaran cacta muchas caiqui.
Yupairuru pucocmallqui,
Runa cunap suyacuinin.
Callpannacpa quemicuinin,
Huaciascaita.

Uyarihuai muchascaita
Diospa rampan Diospamaman
Yurac tocto hamancaiman
Yupascalla, collpascaita
Huahuaiquiman suyuscaita
Ricuchillai.

Heaven's joy!
a thousand times shall we praise you.
O tree bearing thrice-blessed fruit,
O hope of humankind,
helper of the weak.
hear our prayer!

Attend to our pleas,
O column of ivory, Mother of God!
Beautiful iris, yellow and white,
receive this song we offer you;
come to our assistance,
show us the fruit of your womb.

== Recordings ==
- Agrupación Musica, Pérou-Guatémala, Musiques Des Cathédrales Latino-Américaines (ARB, 1991)
- Americas Vocal Ensemble, Gala del Día (Day's Splendor): Choral Music from the Americas (North/South, 2002)
- Cristina Garcia Banegas, Norberto Broggini, and Francis Chapelet, De la musique des Conquistadores au livre d'orgue des indiens Chiquitos (K617, 1999)
- Boston Camerata, dir. Joel Cohen, Nueva Espana: Close Encounters in the New World, 1590–1690 (Erato, 1994)
- Camerata Renacentista de Caracas, Baroque Music of Latin America (Dorian, 2000)
- La Capella Reial de Catalunya and Hespèrion XXI, dir. Jordi Savall, Villancicos y Danzas Criollas (Alia Vox, 2004)
- Convivium Musicum, Old and New Christmas (Musica Rediviva, 2011)
- Coro Exaudi de La Habana, dir. María Felicia Pérez, El Gran Barroco del Perú (Jade Music, 2000)
- Cusco Polyphonic Chorus, Christmas in Cuzco (Arion, 1999)
- Ensemble Elyma, dir. Gabriel Garrido, Hanacpachap: Latin-American Music at the Time of the Conquistadores (Pan Classics, 1991)
- Ensemble Villancico, dir. Peter Pontvik, A La Xácara!: The Jungle Book of the Baroque (Caprice, 2000)
- Ex Cathedra, dir. Jeffrey Skidmore, New World Symphonies: Baroque Music From Latin America (Hyperion Records, 2002)
- Ex Cathedra, dir. Jeffrey Skidmore, Fire burning in snow: Baroque Music from Latin America (Hyperion, 2007) (claims to be first complete version)
- Savae, dir. Eric Casillas, Native Angels (Iago Music, 1996)
- Leonardo García Alarcón/Cappella Mediterranea/Chœur de Chambre de Namur/Ensemble Clematis, Carmina Latina (Ricercar, 2013)
- University of Notre Dame Magnificat Choir, dir. Patrick Kronner, Magnificat (Signum Records, 2024)

== See also ==
- Ollantay, play originally written in the Quechua language

== Edition ==
- Juan Pérez Bocanegra. Ritual, formulario, e institución de curas para administrar a los naturales de este reyno, los santos sacramentos del baptismo, confirmacion, eucaristia, y viatico, penitencia, extremauncion, y matrimonio: con aduertencias muy necessarias. Lima: Geronymo de Contreras, 1631. Online facsimile at the Internet Archive. (This piece appears on page 708.)
