= Jacek Pałkiewicz =

Polish journalist, traveler and explorer (born 1942)

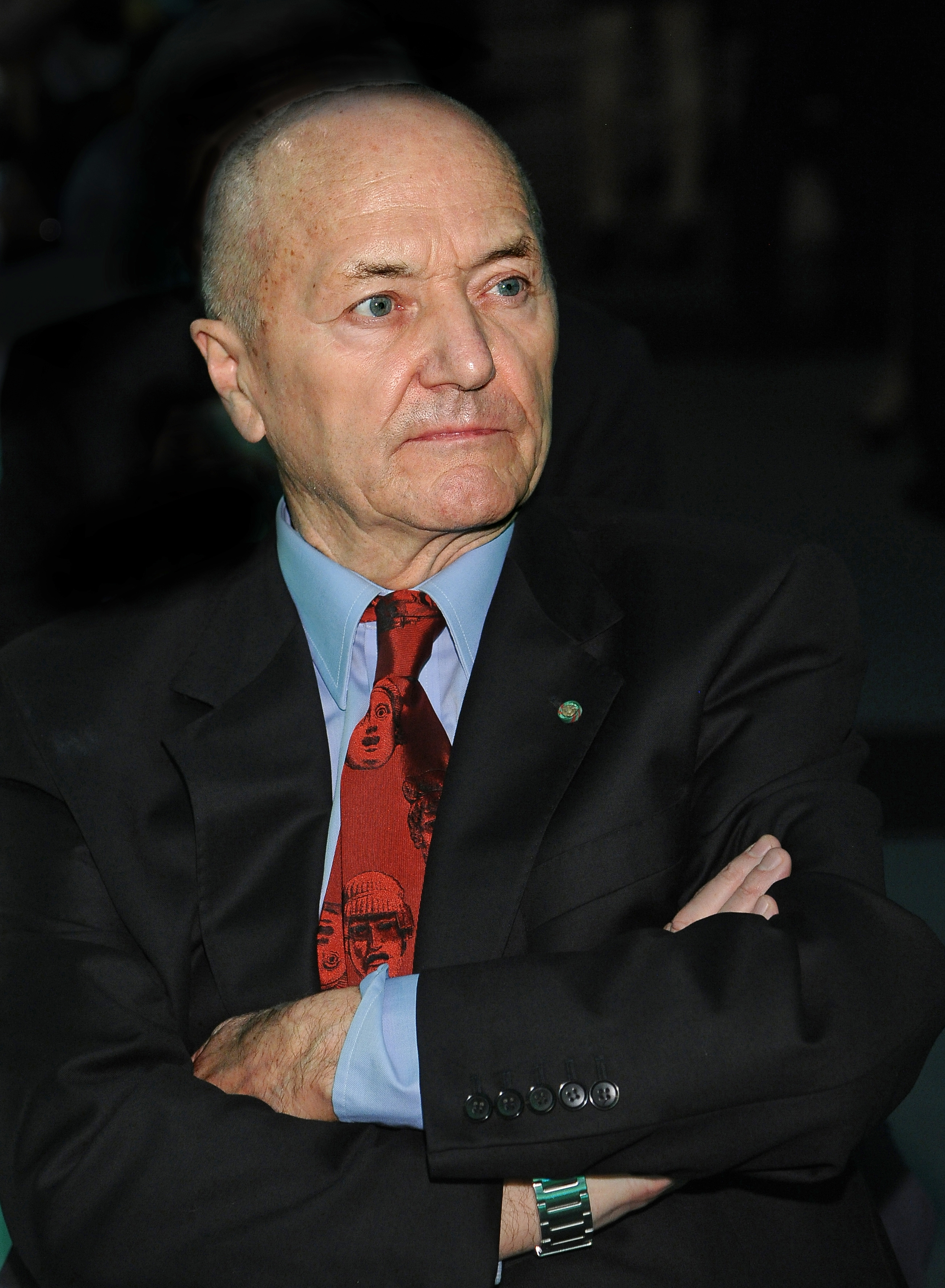
- Born: 2 June 1942 (age 84)
- Occupations: journalist, explorer
- Awards: Pro Ecclesia et Pontifice, Order of Merit of the Italian Republic, Cross of Merit (Poland)
- Website: www.palkiewicz.com

Jacek Pałkiewicz (born 2 June 1942) is a Polish journalist, traveler and explorer. Fellow (by recommendation from Thor Heyerdahl) of the prestigious London-based Royal Geographical Society and numerous other such societies, he is best known for his discovery of the sources of the Amazon River.

Throughout his life, Pałkiewicz collaborated with many respected newspapers, including Corriere della Sera, Rzeczpospolita, Gazzetta dello Sport, Newsweek and National Geographic. He also authored more than 30 books documenting his expeditions and became an internationally recognized expert on survival skills in extreme conditions.

== Biography ==
Jacek Edward Pałkiewicz was born on 2 June 1942 in a German labour camp in Immensen near Lehrte in Lower Saxony, where his mother was forcibly sent during World War II. His parents were of Polish descent. He grew up in a small town in Masuria in northern Poland, from where he emigrated to Italy in 1970. There he met his future wife Linda Vernola. In 1971, he joined the merchant navy of Panama as an officer (though with no formal training). After a brief stay in Sierra Leone, where he worked as a diamond mine manager, he moved to Ghana where he became inspector at a goldmine. In 1972, he headed his first major expedition in which crossed the Sahara desert on foot. Soon afterward he returned to Italy and settled in Milan, where he graduated from a local school of journalism in 1975. Since then, Pałkiewicz has visited all the geographical zones for the documentation of small and inaccessible corners of the world. In 1975, he crossed the Atlantic Ocean alone in a lifeboat – from Dakar, Senegal to Georgetown in 44 days. This kind of valuable experience in extreme conditions was followed closely by both NASA and the Soviet cosmonauts.

In 1989, he led "The Cool Pole" expedition (Yakutsk–Oymiakon, 1200 km) to the coldest place in Siberia (-72 °C) with a reindeer sledge. In 1992, he crossed the jungle of Vietnam on elephants, and in 1995 crossed Bhutan on yaks. Later the same year, another of his expeditions traveled down the Yangtze River in a sampan. He also led the 1994 Cosmonaut's International Ecological Mission in Siberia, under the patronage of Boris Yeltsin, then President of Russia.

He is best known for his 1996 expedition to the Andes. In collaboration with the Pontificia Universidad Católica del Perú in Lima and the Peruvian Navy, he led the scientific expedition "Amazon Source '96", which established the source of the Amazon River to be the Kiwicha snowfield (5170 m) at the feet of Mismi in the Peruvian Andes. This discovery has been accepted by Lima's Geographic Society; thus certifying that this river is the longest in the world (7,040 km).

In 2002, under the patronage of the government of Peru, Pałkiewicz began an expedition upstream the Madre de Dios River in search of the semi-mythical city of Paititi, better known as El Dorado. Currently, he resides in Bassano del Grappa near Venice, where he continues to train various special forces and astronauts in the art of survival. Apart from the Royal Geographical Society, he is also a member of Società Geografica Italiana (1996), Sociedad Geográfica de Lima (1996) and Russian Geographic Society (1996).

== Bibliography ==
- Beyond limits (Oltre ogni limite), Mursia, Milan, 1977;
- The last ocean Mohicans (Gli ultimi Mohicani degli oceani), Mursia, Milan, 1981;
- School of survival (Scuola di sopravivenza), Mursia, Milan, 1986;
- Urban survival manual (Manuale di sopravvivenza urbana), Mursia, Milan, 1986;
- Survival at sea (Scuola di sopravvivenza in mare), Mursia, Milan, 1986;
- My Borneo isle (II mio Borneo), Mursia, Milan, 1986;
- Passport to adven¬ture (Passaporto per I'avventura), Mursia, Milan 1986;
- Siberia (Siberia), Reverdito, Trento, 1990;
- Profession living (Mestiere vivere), Reverdito, Trento, 1990;
- Profession living, Reverdito, Trento, 1990;
- Urban surviving (Vyzivanie v gorodie), Karvet, Moscow, 1992;
- Life (Proffesiya zhizn), Artlik, Moscow, 1993;
- The art of survival (Sztuka przetrwania), Tenten, Warsaw, 1994;
- Urban survival (Sztuka przetrwania w miescie), Tenten, Warsaw, 1994;
- No Limits, Bellona, Warsaw, 1996;
- Passport to adventure (Przepustka do przygody), Bellona, Warsaw, 1996;
- Survival at sea (Przetrwanie na wodzie), Bellona, Warsaw, 1997;
- Exploring for away lands (Po bezdrozach swiata), Morex, Warsaw, 1997;
- Terra Incognita, Bellona, Warsaw, 1997; Survival, Bellona, Warsaw, 1998;
- Angkor, Bellona, Warsaw, 1998;
- How to live in the urban jungle (Jak zyc bezpiecznie w dzungli miasta), Palkiewicz's Found, Warsaw, 2000;
- Adventure (Priklucheniye), Artlik, Moscow, 2001;
- Exploration (L'Esplorazione), Milan, 2002;
- Life's passion (Pasja zycia), KiW, Warsaw, 2003;
- El Dorado, hunting the legend (El Dorado, polowanie na legendę), Zysk i S-ka, Poznań, 2005;
- Hunting the gold El Dorado (V poiskah zolotogo Eldorado), AST Astrel, Moscow, 2005;
- Life's passion (Pasja zycia), Zysk i S-ka, Poznań, 2006;
- Syberia (Siberia), Zysk i S-ka, Poznań, 2007; Angkor, Zysk i S-ka, Poznań, 2007;
- Art of travelling (Sztuka podrozowania), Zysk i S-ka, 2008;
- Exploration (Eksploracja), Zysk i S-ka, 2008;
- The Amazon (Amazonka), Zysk i S-ka, 2009
