= Taki Ongoy (Víctor Heredia album) =

Studio album by Víctor Heredia
- Released: 1986
- Genre: Nueva canción
- Label: Philips Records

Víctor Heredia chronology
Coraje! (1985)	Taki Ongoy (1986)	Un día de gracia (1987)

Taki Ongoy is a 1986 concept album by Argentine singer-songwriter Víctor Heredia. The work is centered around the 16th-century Indigenous movement Taki Unquy and the impact of the Spanish colonization of the Americas. Heredia's maternal grandmother was Capayán.

The album featured collaborations from Argentine musicians Mercedes Sosa, Juan Carlos Baglietto, and Jorge Fandermole, as well as narrations from actor Héctor Tealdi.

The album reaffirms Indigenous culture and religious practices and criticizes the violence of Spanish conquistadores and the Catholic Church. Monsignor Desiderio Collino, bishop of the Diocese of Lomas de Zamora, called for Heredia's excommunication. The Spanish ambassador to Argentina also pressured Raúl Alfonsín, then-president of Argentina, to ban the album.

== Songs ==
Taki Ongoy track listing
No.	Title	Lead vocals	Length
1.	"Texto nº 1 - Tema Introducción / Plática De Los Sabios Y Ancianos / Veinte Mil Años Patria"	Heredia, Héctor Tealdi	7:43
2.	"Taki Ongoy"	Heredia	4:56
3.	"La Puerta Del Cosmos"	Heredia	03:09
4.	"Texto N° 2/Encuentro En Cajamarca"	Heredia, Héctor Tealdi	3:02
5.	"Muerte De Atahualpa"	Heredia	3:35
6.	"Texto N° 3/Año 1530 - Peste"	Heredia, Héctor Tealdi	2:35
7.	"Aya Marcay Quilla"	Heredia, Mercedes Sosa	2:13
8.	"Taki Ongoy II"	Heredia	2:37
9.	"Muerte de Tupac Amaru"	Heredia	4:44
10.	"Texto nº 4 - Don Juan Chalimín"	Heredia, Héctor Tealdi	3:00
11.	"Mutilaciones"	Heredia	3:48
12.	"La cabeza De Pedro Chumay"	Heredia	3:27
13.	"Un pedazo De Mi Sangre"	Heredia, Jorge Fandermole	2:55
14.	"Texto nº 5 - Canción Por La Muerte De Juan Chalimín"	Heredia, Héctor Tealdi	3:44
15.	"Texto nº 6 - Potosí"	Heredia, Héctor Tealdi, Juan Carlos Baglietto	3:17
16.	"Texto nº 7 - Un Dulce Alfarero"	Heredia, Héctor Tealdi	4:05
17.	"Ella Está Conmigo"	Heredia	2:43
18.	"Una Tierra Sin Memoria"	Heredia	4:11

== See also ==
- Taki Unquy
- Inkarri
