= Víctor Heredia =

Argentine singer songwriter (born 1947)

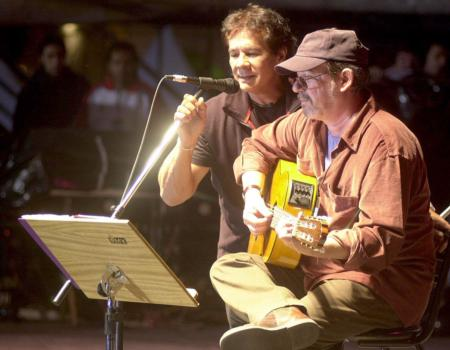
- Víctor Heredia (left) performing with Silvio Rodríguez (right) in 2006

Background information
- Born: Víctor Ramón Cournou Heredia; 24 January 1947 (age 79); Buenos Aires, Argentina
- Genres: Folk music
- Occupation: Singer
- Years active: 1968–present

Víctor Heredia (born 24 January 1947, in Buenos Aires) is an Argentine singer-songwriter.

== Biography ==
He was born in the neighborhood of Monserrat, in the city of Buenos Aires, though he grew up in Paso del Rey, a city in the Moreno area of Greater Buenos Aires. His paternal grandparents are French, whereas his maternal grandfather was Spanish and his maternal grandmother was Capayán, and was born in the Calchaquí Valleys. When he was young, he won the newcomer's prize in the Cosquín Festival.

Many of his songs address what he sees as the social problems in Latin American and various human rights issues. In 1972 the singer turned into the first Argentine entrant in the first edition of the OTI Festival which was held in Madrid. His song "Sabes que estamos aquí América" (You know we are here America) ended last in a tie with other four entrants, his talent didn't go unnoticed. He has recorded with various artists, such as Joan Manuel Serrat, Mercedes Sosa, León Gieco, Milton Nascimento, Cuarteto Zupay, Silvio Rodríguez, and Pablo Milanés, amongst others.

Heredia’s music was censored during the National Reorganization Process. During its regime, the dictatorship forcefully disappeared 8,961 documented individuals—though the true number is estimated to be much higher—including his sister, María Cristina Cornú, who was four months pregnant at the time of her disappearance, and her husband, Claudio Nicolás Grande. Heredia has collaborated closely with associations formed in response to the National Reorganization Process, including the Las Madres de Plaza de Mayo and La Asociación Civil Abuelas de Plaza de Mayo, as well as Indigenous rights organizations.

His works include Todavía Cantamos ("Still We Sing"), Sobreviviendo ("Surviving"), El viejo Matías ("The old man Matías"), Dulce Daniela ("Sweet Daniela"), and Razón de vivir ("Reason to live"). His albums include Taki Ongoy, a conceptual work composed in 1986 in homage to Taki Ongoy, an Indigenous movement that arose in the sixteenth century (1560–1572) in opposition to the Spanish invasion.

== Prizes ==
- Winner of the Viña del Mar International Song Festival in 1994.

== Discography ==
- Gritando esperanzas (1968)
- Victor Heredia (1969)
- El Viejo Matías (1970)
- De Donde Soy (1972)
- Razones (1973)
- Víctor Heredia Canta Pablo Neruda (1974)
  - Released as Cuando estoy triste in Mexico the following year
- Bebe En Mi Cántaro (1975)
- Paso Del Rey (1976)
- Cuando Yo Digo Mujer (1977)
- Que Hermosa Canción (1978)
- Ya Lo Ves, Amanece (1981)
- Puertas Abiertas (1982)
- Recital (1982)
- Canta Pablo Neruda (Reedición) (1983)
- Aquellos Soldaditos de Plomo (1983)
- Solo Quiero La Vida (1984)
- Coraje! (1985)
- Taki Ongoy (1986)
- Un Día De Gracia (1987)
- Memoria (1988)
- Carta De Un Naufrago (1991)
- Mientras Tanto (1992)
- Síndrome de Amor (1994)
- En Vivo En La Trastienda (1995)
- De Amor Y De Sangre (1996)
- Marcas (1998)
- RCA Club (1998)
- Heredia En Vivo Nº 1 (2000)
- Heredia En Vivo Nº 2 (2000)
- Entonces (2001)
- Fénix (2003)
- Argentina Quiere Cantar (2003)
  - With Mercedes Sosa and León Gieco
- Tiernamente Amigos (2005)
- Trilogía (2007)
  - With Mercedes Sosa and León Gieco
- Ciudadano (2008)
- Algun Día... (2013)
- 50 en Vuelo, Capítulo 1 (2017)
- Tu Voz Es Mi Voz (Vivo Teatro Coliseo) (2019)
  - With Teresa Parodi
