= Salarabad, Sonqor =

Salarabad سالاراباد
- Village
- Location within Iran
- Coordinates: 35°01′00″N 47°38′00″E
- Country: Iran
- Province: Kermanshah
- County: Sonqor
- Bakhsh: Central
- Rural District: Gavrud

Population (2006)
  - Total: 562
- Time zone: UTC+3:30 (IRST)
  - Summer (DST): UTC+4:30 (IRDT)

Salarabad (Persian: سالاراباد, also Romanized as Sālārābād; also known as Jāmīn) is a village in Gavrud Rural District, in the Central District of Sonqor County, Kermanshah Province, Iran. At the 2006 census, its population was 562, in 135 families.
