= Jaime Maussan =

Mexican journalist and ufologist (born 1953)

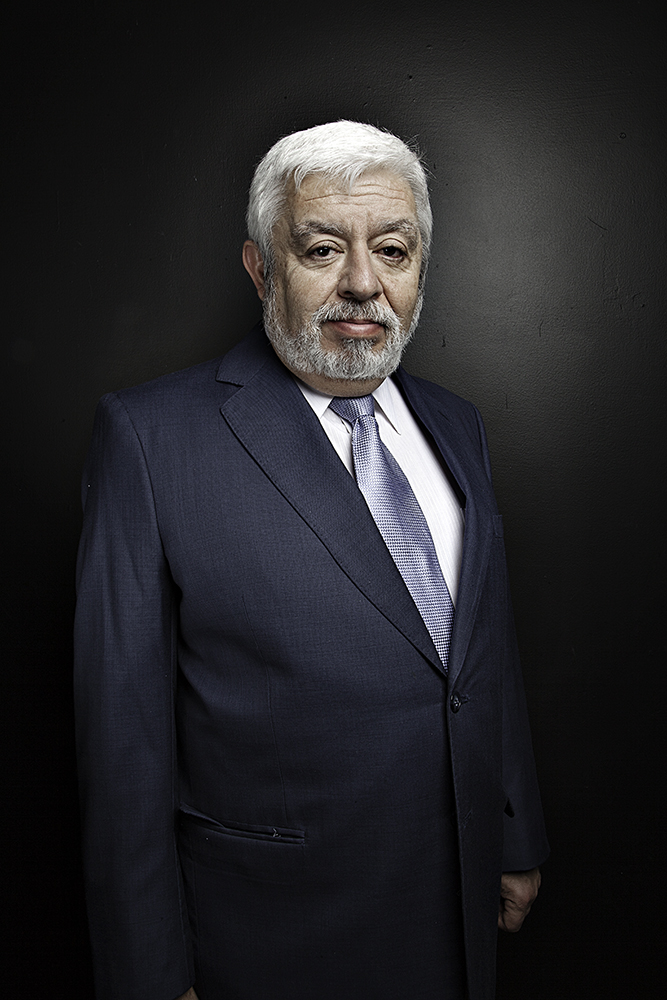
- Born: José Jaime Maussan Flota; 31 May 1953 (age 73); Mexico City, Mexico
- Education: National Autonomous University of Mexico; Miami University
- Website: jaimemaussan.com

José Jaime Maussan Flota (Note: Spanish pronunciation: [xoˌse ˌxaime ˌmausan ˈflota]) (born 31 May 1953) is a Mexican journalist, television personality, and ufologist. He has promoted claims of supposed alien remains that have turned out to be hoaxes.

== Career ==
Since 1970 he has been a reporter at various newspapers and broadcasting outlets, among them El Sol de México, XEX Radio and with Televisa, he worked at 24 Horas newscast and 60 Minutos. With Televisa he was a correspondent at the United States and a general assignment reporter for the Domingo a Domingo (Sunday to Sunday) program hosted by Jacobo Zabludovsky. He also produced stories for the Sunday show.

In June 1990 he was named on the United Nations Environment Programme (UNEP)'s annual Global 500 Roll of Honour.

He founded his own channel, Maussan Televisión, in 2025, by arrangement with Grupo Imagen to use Imagen Televisión's multiplexes.

== Alien claims ==
Maussan was involved in publicizing a specimen dubbed "Metepec Creature", which later turned out to be a skinned monkey, as well as a "Demon Fairy" in 2016, which turned out to be the remains of a bat, wooden sticks, epoxy, and other unknown elements.

In 2015, Maussan led an event called "Be Witness" where a mummified body claimed to be an alien child was unveiled. The mummified corpse was later identified as a human child.

In 2017, Maussan appeared in a video hosted by Gaia, Inc. where a mummified body supposedly discovered in Peru near the Nazca lines claimed to be "a three-fingered alien" was unveiled.

A 2017 report by the Peruvian prosecutor's office stated that supposed alien bodies promoted by Maussan were actually “recently manufactured dolls, which have been covered with a mixture of paper and synthetic glue to simulate the presence of skin.”

On 12 September 2023, Maussan unveiled two allegedly "nonhuman beings" to Mexico's first Congress of the Union public hearing regarding UFOs. Maussan claimed that these were mummified corpses found in a diatom mine in the city of Cusco, Peru near Nazca, and were believed to be more than 1,000 years old. Maussan claimed that scientists at the National Autonomous University of Mexico (UNAM) came to the conclusion that, in his words, the corpses are not "part of our terrestrial evolution" and that almost a third of their DNA is of "unknown origin", however Julieta Fierro, physics researcher at UNAM, stated that the university never endorsed such claims and that Maussan's data "made no sense." UNAM further republished their September 2017 statement specifying that they did not make any conclusion as to the origins of a sample sent to them for carbon-14 testing and that no other kind of testing was performed by them. Wired reported that "mummies" presented by Maussan are believed to be "an elaborate hoax made of human and animal bones".

In November 2023, Maussan held a second presentation at the Mexican Congress regarding "three-fingered Peruvian mummies". Maussan claimed that they were "not related to any life on Earth". The presentation included the testimonies of several doctors who said the bodies were those of previously living organisms, presenting the remains as "potential evidence of non-human life forms", while "declining to certify that the remains were extraterrestrial". Anthropologist Roger Zuniga stated that "there was absolutely no human intervention in the physical and biological formation of these beings". However, forensic archaeologist Flavio Estrada, who examined the specimens for the prosecutor's office of Peru, said, "They are not extraterrestrials, they are not intraterrestrials, they are not a new species, they are not hybrids, they are none of those things that this group of pseudo-scientists who for six years have been presenting with these elements", adding that the humanoid dolls consisted of animal and human bones assembled with synthetic glue.

== Hydrotene claims ==
In late 2020, Maussan became associated with the promotion of a purported COVID-19 treatment named "Hydrotene." The product, championed by Juan Alfonso García Urbina, was claimed to have a 96% effectiveness rate against viral diseases. It was promoted as a natural remedy with decades of research behind it by Maussan and doctors José de Jesús Zalce Benítez, Víctor Gómez Lermaand, and Jesús Morán. The scientific community does not recognize Hydrotene as a legitimate treatment for COVID-19. The product's promotion reached a peak when Morena senator, Lucía Trasviña Waldenrath, organized a forum titled "Hydrotene: Strategies and Alternatives for COVID-19 Treatment," in which Maussan was slated to participate. However, the event faced significant backlash on social media, particularly due to Maussan's involvement, leading to its cancellation. Experts and academics have denounced Hydrotene as a "miracle product," cautioning against its unproven claims and lack of scientific validation.
