= Pusharo =

Archaeological site in Peru

Coordinates: 12.5843°S 71.4860°W

The Petroglyphs of Pusharo constitute a unique and extensive ancient rock art archaeological site in southeastern Peru's Manú National Park, an expanse of rain forest that still contains unexplored and little known areas, and for which an official government permit is required for entry.

== Discovery ==
It appears that a rubber tapper who participated in a violent attack on indigenous people in 1909 may have been the first non-indigenous person to encounter the petroglyphs, with the next visit having been made by Vicente Cenitagoya, a missionary of the Dominican Order, in 1921. A smattering of adventurers began to arrive at the site in the 1950s, and in 1969 it was visited by the Peruvian physician Dr. Carlos Neuenschwander Landa (who would return in later years accompanied by Peruvian explorer, Sr. Santiago Yábar). In 1970 another Dominican, Padre Adolfo Torrealba, reached the site, followed by Japanese explorer Yoshiharo Sekino, and the French-Peruvian explorers Herbert and Nicole Cartagena in 1978. Two years later, it was visited by Peruvian archaeologist Federico Kauffmann Doig. In 1991 the party of North American explorer Gregory Deyermenjian, including Peruvian explorer Paulino Mamani and the previously mentioned Santiago Yábar, arrived at Pusharo. The site has since been visited and studied by rock art scholar Rainer Hostnig.

In 2008, it was the subject of a documentary-trek filmed for the BBC television series Extreme Dreams presented by Ben Fogle.

In 2016, the petroglyphs of the site played an important role in the research of Vincent Pélissier, as he searched for the mythical lost city of Paititi. In the research, the petroglyphs were interpreted as a map, leading from the glyphs to the city. The research assumes two things as fact: the petroglyphs are a map, and the carvings were made by the Inca. Neither of these assumptions have been proven definitively.

== Description ==
The site is made up of an array of deeply incised rock carvings that cover up to a height of 9 feet, a perpendicular rock face that is over 100 feet long and 75 feet high. Its location is on the south shore of the Río Palatoa (designated on some maps at this location as the Porotoa, and known by others as the Palatoa Chico). The petroglyphs are thought by some researchers to be purely pan-Amazonian in origin, and of mistico-religious or shamanic significance to those Amerindians of past centuries who must have been their creators. Others believe that there is an Inca component that is now coming to light, and that the petroglyphs constitute parts of a map. Definitive word on the meaning of Pusharo's petro glyphs must wait until further research is conducted and completed. The petroglyphs contain elements such as heart-shaped faces, some with double borders, spirals, zigzags, suns, "curlicue Xs" and others that defy verbal description.
