= Mameria =

Archaeological site in Peru

Coordinates: 12.7718°S 71.8470°W

Mameria is an area of high-elevation jungle to the northeast of the Paucartambo range in southeast Peru, drained by the Mameria River, an affluent of the Nistrón River. Until the 1960s this remote and sparsely populated area would have been considered a part of the Callanga jungle area. Machiguenga peoples, fleeing the slavery that they were subject to along the Yavero River, fled to this area which acquired its current name from the Machiguenga observing that "mameri," which means "there are none," regarding the lack of fish in the river.

Mameria has pre-Columbian stone ruins that are the remains of ancient Incan coca plantations, some of which were sacked by the Peruvian helicopter-borne General Ludwig Essenwanger in 1980, a year after the area was first brought to the attention of the outside world by the also helicopter-borne expedition made by French-Peruvian explorers Herbert and Nicole Cartagena, guided by Peruvian campesino/adventurer Goyo Toledo. The Cartagena's book, Paititi, dernier refuge des Incas (1981) recounts their expedition of their search for the lost city of Paititi.

In 1980 Goyo Toledo returned—on foot—to Mameria, the first known person since the ancient Incans to do so. The next year his brother Gabino, and Guillermo Mamani, made their way to Mameria to look for, and find, Goyo. In 1983 an architect/adventurer from Cusco, César Vilchez, his nephew César Medina, Carlos Cartagena, and Manuel Guevarra found their way to Mameria in a grueling two-month journey during which they nearly perished from hunger. Between 1984 and 1989 the American explorer Gregory Deyermenjian made five expeditions to Mameria—for three of which he was accompanied by Peruvian explorer Paulino Mamani H.—conducting anthropological as well as archaeological research concerning the area's Machiguenga inhabitants and ancient archaeological remains.

In the mid-1990s the Peruvian adventurer Darwin Moscoso made a long journey to Mameria, later producing a fine map of the area. An in-depth review of the history and archaeology of Mameria can be found in Deyermenjian's article Mameria: An Incan Site Complex in the High-Altitude Jungles of Southeast Peru, in the Volume 3 Number 4 (2003) issue of Athena Review. Deyermenjian sees Mameria as having functioned as an Incan frontier settlement, providing coca to the Incas of the highlands in pre-Conquest times, which became totally forgotten after the fall of the highland Incas to the Spaniards, protected until even now by its remote location, difficulty of access, and the difficulty of life there.
