= Juan Pérez Bocanegra =

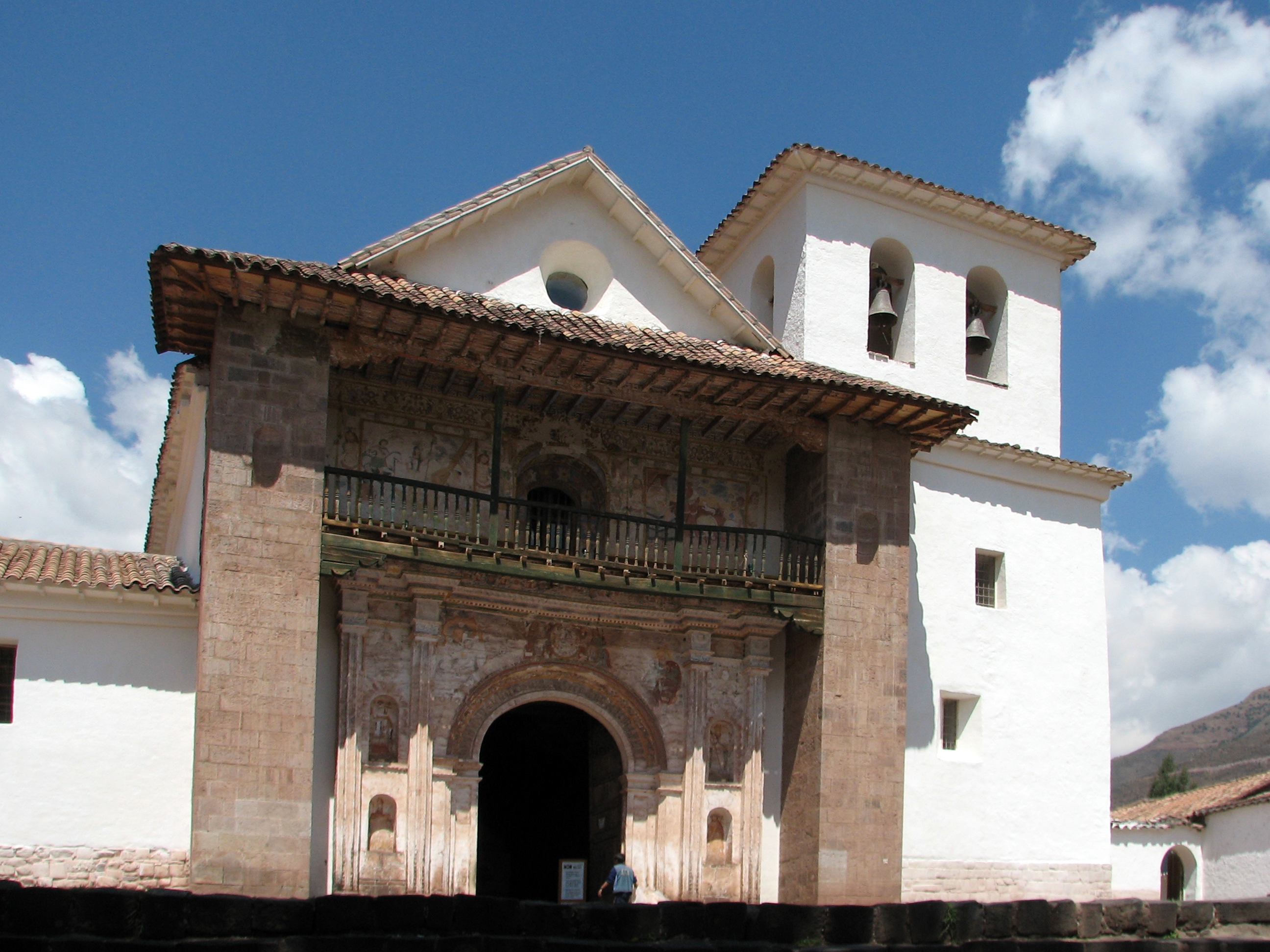
Pérez de Bocanegra was a parish priest in this church in Andahuaylillas

Juan Pérez de Bocanegra, TOSF (died 1645) was a Catholic priest and member of the Third Order of St. Francis, who was a musician, and specialist in the indigenous languages of colonial Peru.

== Life ==
Pérez de Bocanegra established himself in the Viceroyalty of Peru as one of the most important experts in the local languages and ways of life. He taught Latin at the University of San Marcos in Lima before moving to Cusco. He then served as the cantor at the Cathedral of Santo Domingo there from c. 1599–1611, serving as choir-book corrector from 1598-1604, during the episcopacy of Antonio de la Raya y Navarrete. He served as examiner general for the native languages Quechua and Aymara for the Diocese of Cusco, and was for many years a parish priest in Andahuaylillas. His name appears on the cornerstone of the church at Andahuaylillas. He got painter Luis de Riaño to paint the ornate murals inside, for which the church is sometimes called "the Sistine Chapel of America."

As a Franciscan, Pérez de Bocanegra was sometimes in conflict with the Jesuits about how to translate Christian terminology into native languages. Jesuits favored loan words from Spanish, which were free of heterodox implications, while Bocanegra preferred to draw on the rich imagery of the Andean linguistic resources. The Jesuit position became official at the Third Council of Lima (1582–83), but Pérez de Bocanegra continued his practice by avoiding literal translations and separating the Spanish and Quechua passages in his works. He and the Jesuits also disputed how to use Andahuaylillas; the Jesuits wished to make his parish a Quechua-language training center similar to the Aymara one they had established in Juli.

Pérez de Bocanegra is best known for the publication of a work entitled Ritual, formulario e institución de curas (1631), which gave texts to various rituals in both Quechua and Spanish. It is particularly noted for Hanacpachap cussicuinin, the earliest polyphonic vocal work printed in the New World. It is unknown whether the hymn was composed by him or a local indigenous person.

== Writings ==
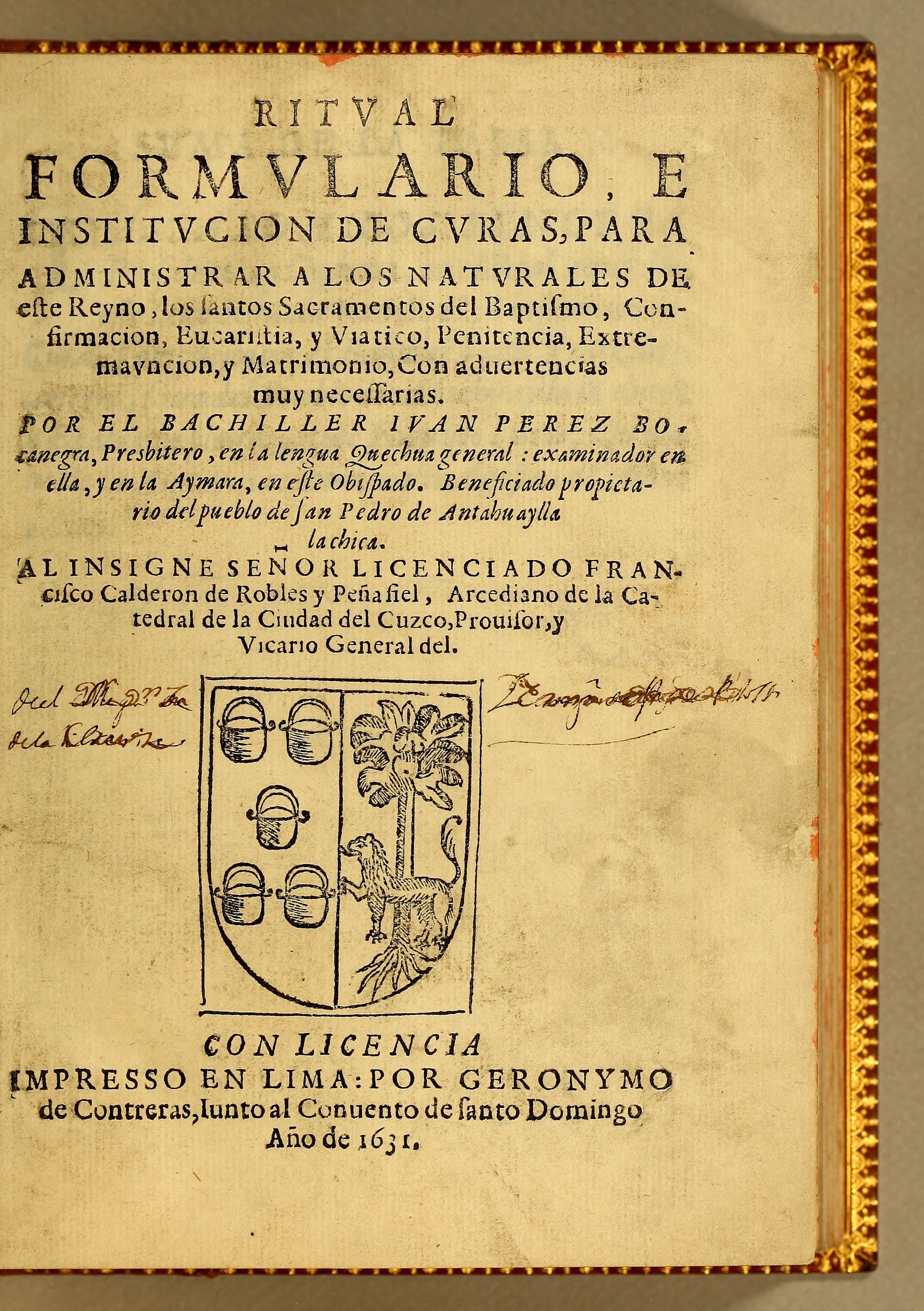
Title page, Ritual formulario, e institucion de curas, para administrar a los naturales de este reyno, los santos sacramentos del baptismo, confirmacion, eucaristia, y viatico, penitencia, extremauncion, y matrimonio, : con aduertencias muy necessarias (Lima, 1631)

- Juan Pérez Bocanegra. Ritual, formulario, e institución de curas para administrar a los naturales de este reyno, los santos sacramentos del baptismo, confirmacion, eucaristia, y viatico, penitencia, extremauncion, y matrimonio: con aduertencias muy necessarias. Lima: Geronymo de Contreras, 1631. 720 pp. digital facsimile from the John Carter Brown Library collection at the Internet Archive.
