= Takis Dimopoulos =

Greek essayist, novelist and philologist

- Native name: Τάκης Δημόπουλος
- Born: 1898 Pyrgos
- Died: 1981 (aged 82–83) Athens
- Occupation: Writer and commentator on literature
- Notable works: 'The Dithyramb of the Rose' (1934), 'Logos and Art' (1975) 'Sikelianos, the Orphic' (1981)

Takis Dimopoulos (Greek: Τάκης Δημόπουλος, Pyrgos, Greece, 1898 – Athens, Greece 1981) was a Greek essayist, novelist and philologist.

== Life ==
Dimopoulos was born in Pyrgos, a city in the Peloponnese region of Greece, in 1898.

He was a member of the Association of Greek Writers, and collaborated with the magazines Anglo-Greek Review, Nea Estia, Nea Skepsi and Parnassos, and also with newspapers like Avgi Pyrgou, Kathimerini, Neologos, Patris, etc. His commentary was on essays, prose and poetry and dealt with issues of aesthetics and philosophy in literature, especially regarding the poetry of Angelos Sikelianos, with whom he was very close. He also worked with the writers Renée Jacquin, Paulette Ghiron-Bistagne and Phaedon K. Mpoumpoulidis.

He passed away in 1981 in Athens.

== Relationship with Sikelianos ==
During the interwar period Dimopoulos became one of the writers who attempted a systematic study of Sikelianos' work. He analysed the erotic parts of his poetry, their "Delphic Idea" (the concept of Delphi as a forum for an international meeting centre of the most important scholars to express their "love for humanity"), and the syncretism of Hellenism and Christianity. His analysis of Sikelianos' work created the specific aesthetics, worldviews, forms and genres surrounding his poetry.

Dimopoulos was not only a personal friend of Sikelianos, but also a keen scholar of his work. In Dimopoulos, Sikelianos found a supporter of the "Delphic Idea", but also a tracker of the ideas and necessary predispositions needed to capture his vision. In his studies, Dimopoulos demonstrates the link and the integration of the Delphic Idea to the main poetic body of Sikelianos' work as a concept that encompasses many seemingly contradictory entities in a unified and multifaceted outlook.

The ancient-mythic, the Dionysian-Bacchic, the Orphic-mystic, the physiological-regenerative, Hellenic-Christian, erotic-maternal, national-competitive, the oecumene, peaceful-conciliatory elements, were the poetic themes of Sikelianos' work that were researched and interpreted by Dimopoulos.

== Indicative list of works ==
- Logic (1901)
- The Dithyramb of the Rose (1934) (critic review of Sikelianos' tragedy)
- Sikelianos. The dialectic of a lyrical life (1971) (study)
- Logos and Art (1975) (study)
- Sikelianos, the Orphic (1981) (study)
- Reflections (1985) (unpublished lectures, calendar pages and literary excerpts)
- Angelos Sikelianos. The poet and connoisseur (1988) (two-volume edition of Sikelianos' work)
- Olympia and the Olympic Games (1996)
