= Inkarri =

Legend of the return of the Inca Atahualpa

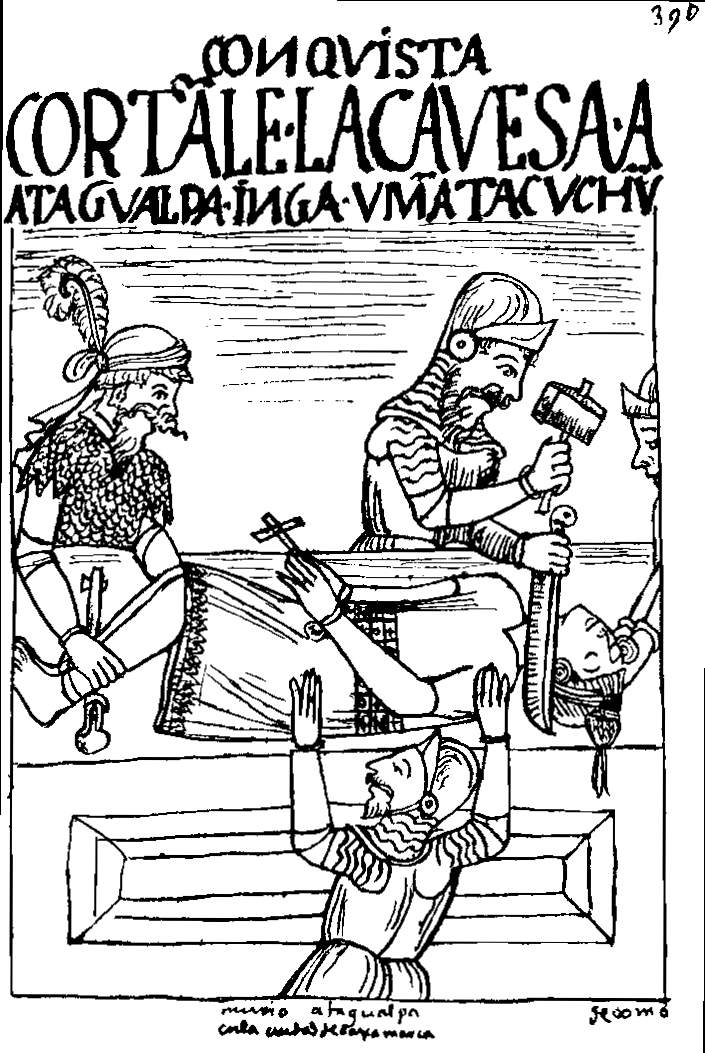
Drawing depicting the execution of Atahualpa

The Inkarri (or Inkari and sometimes Inkaríy) myth is one of the most famous legends of the Inca. When the Spanish conquistadors executed the last ruler of the Inca people, Atahualpa, he vowed that he would come back one day to avenge his death. According to the legend, the Spaniards buried his body parts in several places around the kingdom: His head is said to rest under the Presidential Palace in Lima, while his arms are said to be under the Waqaypata ('Square of Tears') in Cusco and his legs in Ayacucho. Buried under the earth he will grow until the day that he will rise, take back his kingdom and restore harmony in the relationship between Pacha Mama (the earth goddess) and her children.

Since it has been passed on orally for many generations, several different versions of the Inkarri myth exist. The name Inkarri probably evolved from the Spanish Inca-rey ('Inca-king').

The mythical lost city of Paititi is said to have been founded by Inkarri.

== In popular culture ==
The legend of Inkarri is the background story and the title of a novel by Ryan Miller.

A comprehensive analysis in French has been published on the web as "Incarri, la prophétie du retour de l'Inca".

The legend of Inkarri is addressed as a character in the James Rollins novel Excavation.

== See also ==
- Inca mythology
- Taki Unquy
- King in the mountain – Motif in folklore and mythology
- Quechua people
