= Sebastiano Caboto =

Sebastiano Caboto may refer to:

- Sebastian Cabot (explorer) (c. 1474–1557), Italian explorer known in Italian as Sebastiano Caboto
- Italian gunboat Sebastiano Caboto, an Italian naval vessel in service as a gunboat from 1913 to 1938 and as a submarine tender from 1938 to 1943

== See also ==
- Sebastian Cabot (actor)
