= Caboto =

Caboto may refer to:

- John Cabot (c. 1450–c. 1500), Italian explorer known as Giovanni Caboto in Italian
- Sebastian Cabot (explorer) (c. 1474–1557), Italian explorer known as Sebastiano Caboto in Italian
- Italian gunboat Sebastiano Caboto, an Italian naval vessel in service as a gunboat from 1913 to 1938 and as a submarine tender from 1938 to 1943

== See also ==
- Sebastian Cabot (actor)
