= Gaboto =

- Town
- Location of Gaboto in Argentina
- Coordinates: 32°26′S 60°49′W
- Country: Argentina
- Province: Santa Fe
- Department: San Jerónimo

Population
  - Total: 2,617
- Time zone: UTC-3 (ART)
- CPA base: S2208
- Dialing code: +54 3476

Gaboto (often referred to as Puerto Gaboto) is a town (comuna) in the southeast of the province of Santa Fe, Argentina. It has 2,617 inhabitants per the 2001 census [INDEC]. The town lies 92 km (57 mi) south of the provincial capital, by the Coronda River, and immediately north of the mouth of the Carcarañá River (both are tributaries of the Paraná River).

The town's name is a homage to Sebastian Cabot, one of the first explorers of the area, who established the fort of Sancti Spiritu near Gaboto's location in 1527. It was the first Spanish settlement in present-day Argentina.

Gaboto was founded in 1891. It was a site of economical importance due to its port, which has a natural depth of 9 to 11 m, but in the 1930s, trade began declining, and the pier was dismantled in 1945. The area is still important as a fishing location for certain species such as the golden dorado (Salminus brasiliensis).
