= Colonial Argentina =

Period of Spanish colonisation

Colonial Argentina is designated as the period of the history of Argentina during which it was an overseas territory of the Spanish Empire. It begins in the Pre-Columbian Age of the Indigenous peoples of Argentina, with the arrival of the first Spanish conqueror.

== European Invasion ==
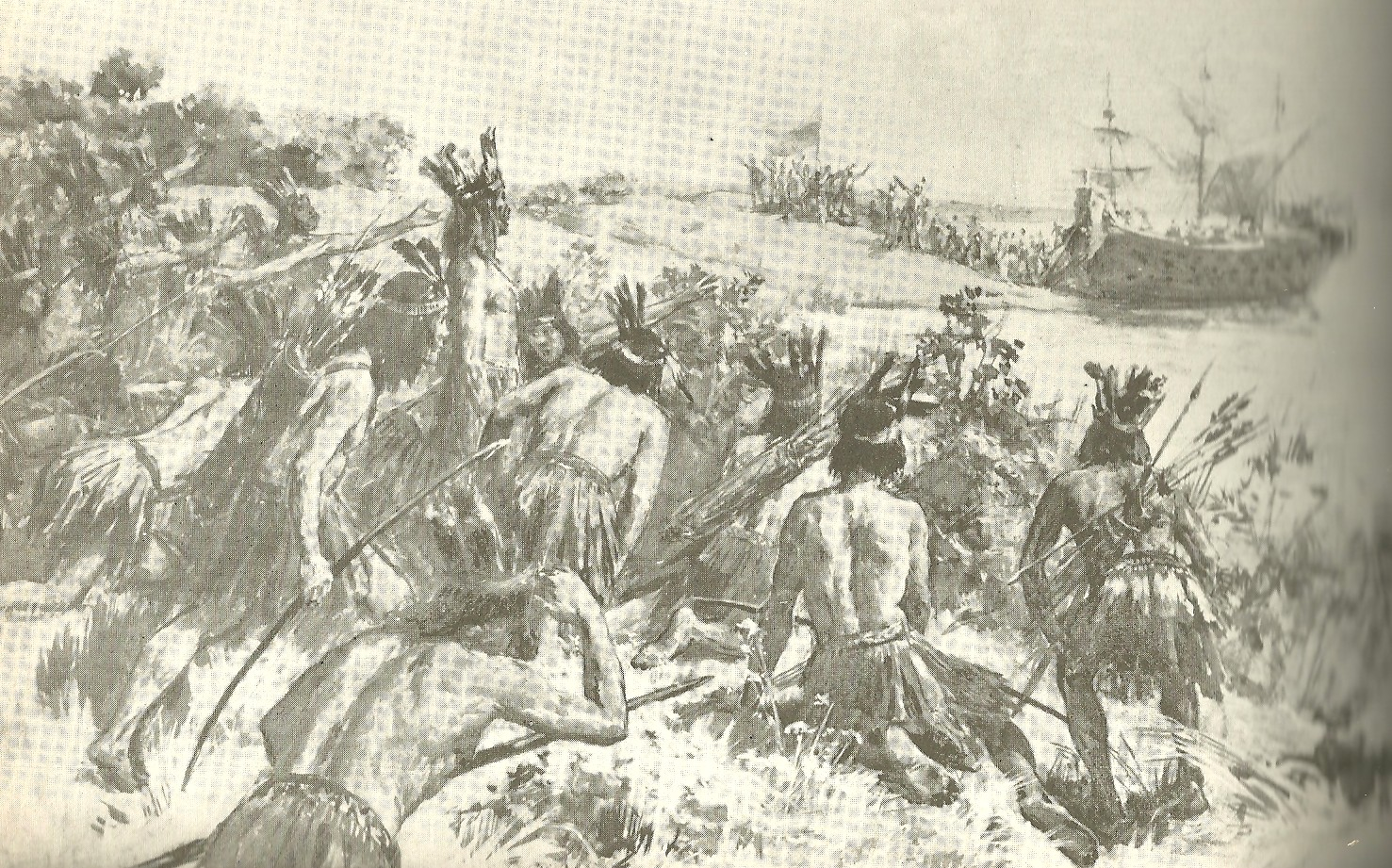
Discovery of the Río de la Plata by Juan Díaz de Solís. He would be attacked and killed by charrúas after it.

When Spain and Portugal realized that the Americas were not the Indies but a new and unknown continent, they settled the portions with the Treaty of Tordesillas, dividing an eastern section of South America for Portugal and the rest for Spain. However, most of the geography of the Americas was still unknown, and many navigators sought a passage to the East Indies rather than exploring the Americas.

The voyage of Ferdinand Magellan continued towards the south, passed the Strait of Magellan, and eventually completed the first circumnavigation of the world.

The first navigators of the Americas through unexplored territories, navigated into the wide Río de la Plata expecting to find a passage to the west and reach Asia, new navigations were fostered by the rumors of silver sources (such rumors are one of the early reasons of the name of Argentina).

There were land expeditions coming from the north as well, from Lima. However, the lack of precious metals in the area, and the absence of local empires like the Aztecs in Mexico or the Incas in Peru, did not allow a notable growth of the Spanish populations in the area.

=== Juan Díaz de Solís ===
The first European to disembark in what is now Argentina was Juan Díaz de Solís, who discovered the Río de la Plata. Solís was killed by Charrúas, along with other sailors, and his fleet returned to Spain.

The sailor Francisco del Puerto, part of Solís' voyage, was spared by the Charruas because of his young age, and stayed on the Americas for some years.

=== Sebastian Cabot ===
Francisco del Puerto was rescued by the Venetian Sebastian Cabot, and told him about myths of sources of silver in the area. This promoted further explorations in the area. There was no silver, nor any other precious metal, but those initial myths influenced the modern name of Argentina.

The voyage of Cabot, expecting to conquer the lands of the inexistent "White King", established the fortification of Sancti Spiritu, next to the Paraná River. The voyage was a complete failure: they did not get any metals, Sancti Spiritu was destroyed by the native people, and the remaining Europeans returned to Europe.

=== The exploration of Argentina ===
The exploration of Argentina in 1534 begins from two separate directions. Francisco de Aguirre heads into the area from the west over the Andes and Pedro González de Mendoza comes in from the Río de la Plata region. Juan de Ayolas, Domingo, Martínez de Irala, Jerónimo Ochoa de Eizaguirre, Andrés de Arzamendia, Juan de Estigarribia, Galaz de Medrano and Fernando de Gasteiz accompany Mendoza.

== Colonization ==
The Argentine area was within the Spanish colonial entities of:

- Governorate of New Andalusia (1524−1542)
- Governorate of the Río de la Plata (1549–1776), under the supervision of the Real Audiencia of Lima in the Viceroyalty of Peru (1541−1661), then the first Royal Audiencia of Buenos Aires (1661−1671).
- Viceroyalty of the Río de la Plata (1776–1814), under the governing supervision of the second Royal Audiencia of Buenos Aires (1783−1810) in the south, and Real Audiencia of Charcas in the north, until the Independence of Argentina.

The new ideas of the Age of Enlightenment and the events of the Peninsular War started the Argentine Wars of Independence, a theater of the greater Spanish American wars of independence.

== See also ==
- Viceroyalty of the Río de la Plata topics
- Spanish colonization of the Americas
