= Umberto Pugliese =

General in the Royal Italian Navy

- Born: January 13, 1880; Alessandria, Kingdom of Italy
- Died: July 15, 1961 (aged 81); Sorrento, Italy
- Military career
- Allegiance: Kingdom of Italy
- Branch: Regia Marina
- Service years: 1893–1938, 1941–1945
- Rank: General of the Corps of Naval Engineering
- Conflicts: Italo-Turkish War; World War I; World War II
- Awards: Order of the Crown of Italy; Order of Saints Maurice and Lazarus

Umberto Pugliese (January 13, 1880, in Alessandria – July 15, 1961, in Sorrento) was a general in the Engineering Corps of the Royal Italian Navy during the 1930s. He designed the Littorio-class battleships and was the ideator of the torpedo defense system named after him.

== Biography ==
He was born in Alessandria on January 13, 1880, into a Jewish family. At age thirteen he was admitted to the Royal Naval Academy of Livorno, graduating in 1898 as ensign, and then attended Naval High School of Genoa, graduating in naval and mechanical engineering in 1901 and joining the Corps of Naval Engineering on the following year, after which he served at the Castellammare di Stabia dockyard and the Arsenal of La Spezia.

He later served on the battleships Vittorio Emanuele and Regina Margherita. In 1908 he distinguished himself in rescue operations after the Messina Earthquake. In 1912, after serving as engineer officer on torpedo boats during the Italo-Turkish War, he was assigned to the Committee for the examination of ship designs, collaborating in the following decade with General Edgardo Ferrati in the design of battleships.

From 1925 to 1931 he was director of the Castellammare di Stabia Yard and subsequently of shipbuilding in La Spezia, where he supervised the construction of the heavy cruiser Zara and the light cruiser Armando Diaz, whose constructions were carried out in the Muggiano shipyard by Odero Terni Orlando.

After promotion to General of the Naval Engineering Corps for exceptional merits, in February 1931 he was appointed to the General Directorate of Naval and Mechanical Constructions at the Ministry of the Navy, collaborating in the design of the light cruisers of the Montecuccoli and Duca d'Aosta classes, designing the conning tower for battleships and cruisers, and thus eliminating the previous superstructures which constituted a conspicuous and unprotected target, which being spread over a large part of the ships were more easily exposed to offenses; the new conception of the conning tower also aroused interest abroad, to the point that it was adopted by the Soviet Navy for its cruisers of the Maxim Gorky class.

He subsequently collaborated in the reconstruction of the battleships Duilio and Cavour and was the designer of the 35,000-ton battleships of the Littorio class, as well as the ideator of the anti-submarine protection system called Pugliese cylinders, which was adopted on these ships. He donated the patent of his torpedo system to the Italian State. In 1937 he was awarded the honor of Knight of the Grand Cross awarded with the Grand Cordon of the Order of the Crown of Italy. Soon after, however, his career was ended by the proclamation of the Racial Laws of 1938, as he was dismissed from service for being a Jew.

In November 1940, following the British air raid on Taranto, Supermarina asked for his help in the salvage and repair of the torpedoed battleships; he accepted with the only condition of being allowed to don his uniform again. Taking advantage of some loopholes provided by the Italian racial legislation, which provided for declaring the anti-Semitic provisions not applicable to some special categories (article 14 of Royal Decree number 1728) including those who had acquired "exceptional merits", in July 1941 the decree which had resulted in him being forcibly placed on absolute leave was revoked. A few days before the proclamation of the armistice of Cassibile he was awarded the honor of Knight of the Grand Cross of the Order of Saints Maurice and Lazarus by King Victor Emmanuel III.

After the armistice of Cassibile and the German occupation of Italy, Italian Jews were persecuted, and in January 1944 he was captured in Rome by the SS and imprisoned via Tasso prison. Later released on parole after persuading his captors that he was "Aryan", he fled to Northern Italy, where he hoped to find his sister Gemma, who however had been arrested in Sanremo in November 1943 and deported to Auschwitz, from where she never returned. He went into hiding and managed to evade capture until the end of the war.

After the war he was president of the National Institute for the Studies and Experiences of Naval Architecture, a position he held until early 1961. In May 1954, having reached age limits, he was placed on absolute leave. He died in Sorrento on July 15, 1961.
