= Italian gunboat Ermanno Carlotto =

Italian gunboat

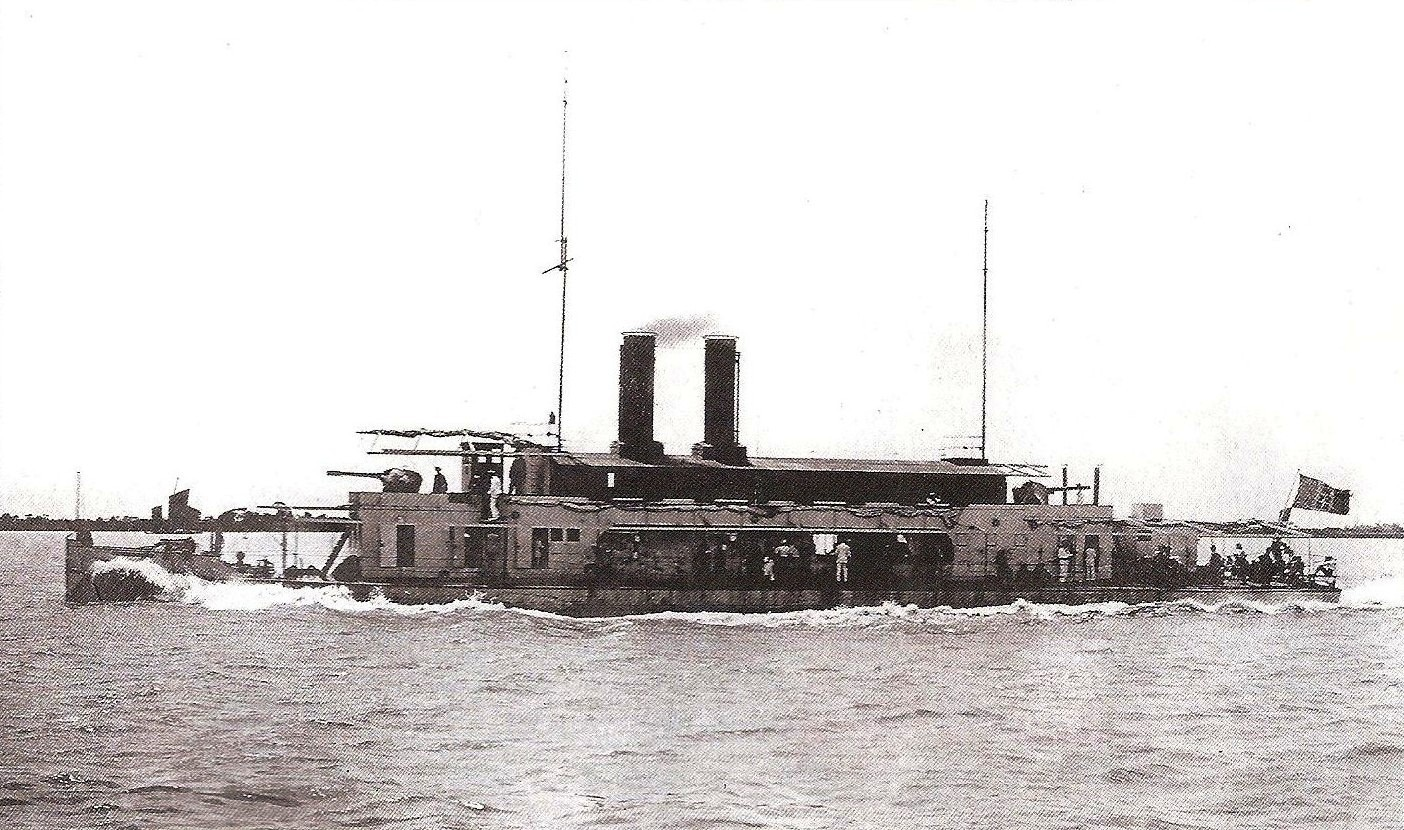
- Carlotto sailing on a river in China in the late 1930s.

History

Italy
- Name: Ermanno Carlotto
- Namesake: Ermanno Carlotto
- Builder: Shanghai Docks and Engineering Company, Shanghai
- Laid down: March 1914
- Launched: 19 June 1918
- Commissioned: 28 February 1921
- Motto: Parva favilla gran fiamma seconda
- Fate: Scuttled on 9 September 1943

Empire of Japan
- Name: Narumi
- Namesake: Narumi-juku
- Commissioned: October 1943
- Fate: Transferred to the Republic of China Navy in 1945-46 as reparations

Republic of China
- Name: Chien Kun
- Namesake: Chinese: 錢坤
- Commissioned: 1 January 1947
- Fate: Captured or scuttled between 1947 and 1949

People's Republic of China
- Name: Qian Kun
- Commissioned: 1949
- Fate: Scrapped between 1958 and 1976

General characteristics
- Class & type: river gunboat
- Displacement: 247 t (243 long tons) standard; 318 t (313 long tons) full load
- Length: 48.8 m (160 ft 1 in)
- Beam: 7.5 m (24 ft 7 in)
- Draught: 0.84–0.91 m (2.8–3.0 ft) (light); 1–1.3 m (3.3–4.3 ft) (full load)
- Installed power: 1,100 hp (810 kW)
- Propulsion: 2 × Yarrow coal boilers (later oil fired); 2 × vertical triple expansion steam engines with 3 cylinders; 2 × shafts
- Speed: 13.5–14 kn (15.5–16.1 mph; 25.0–25.9 km/h)
- Range: 1,250 nmi (2,320 km; 1,440 mi) at 8–9 knots (15–17 km/h; 9.2–10.4 mph)
- Complement: 4 officers, 56 non-commissioned officers and sailors
- Armament: As built: 2 × 76.2 mm (3 in) L/40 naval guns; 6 × 8 mm (0.31 in) machine guns; 2 × 6.5 mm (0.26 in) machine guns; Later: 2 × 76.2 mm (3 in) L/40 guns; 6 × 8 mm (0.31 in) machine guns; From 1943: 2 × Type 3 76.2 mm (3 in) L/40 naval guns; 2 × Type 96 25 mm (0.98 in) naval guns; 2 (later 4) × Type 93 13.2 mm (0.52 in) anti-aircraft machine guns; 4 × Type 92 7.7 mm (0.30 in) machine guns
- Notes: data taken from Italiani a Shanghai, In guerra sul mare, Trentoincina, Navyworld, Materials of IJN, Ramius-Militaria, Oceania and Almanacco Storico Navale

Ermanno Carlotto was a river gunboat of the Italian Regia Marina (Royal Navy). After the Italian armistice of 1943 she served in the Imperial Japanese Navy as Narumi, while after the end of World War II she was used by the Navy of the Republic of China and then by the Navy of the People's Republic of China as Qian Kun.

== History ==
=== Service in the Regia Marina ===
==== Construction ====
In 1910, at the request of the Italian foreign ministry (in turn contacted by the Italian ambassador in Beijing), the Regia Marina decided to build two river gunboats to be stationed in China, to protect the Italian communities along the Chinese rivers and in particular the upper Yangtze and the Hai, where Italian traders and entrepreneurs had built textile factories and managed commercial activities. Larger ships, in fact, could not go beyond Wusong (at the mouth of the Yangtze) and Hankou (and moreover, for economic reasons, the Regia Marina could not afford to maintain warships on station in the Far East: for years the protection of the Italian communities was entrusted to the French). Between March 1911 and November 1913 the gunboat Sebastiano Caboto was built in Italy, of a 1,000-ton displacement, which reached Shanghai in April 1914 after a four-month trip.

The second gunboat (designed in 1913) would be smaller than Sebastiano Caboto (247 t (243 long tons) of standard displacement and 84–91 cm (2.76–2.99 ft) of draft; also the freeboard was visibly reduced) in order to be able to go upstream of the rivers more easily and safely, overcoming currents and shallows where Sebastiano Caboto had had problems (especially on the upper course of the Yangtze, characterized by strong currents in the final stretch). It was decided to order the construction at a Chinese shipyard. On the orders of the naval general staff the commander of the armored cruiser Marco Polo , based in China (according to other sources, the commander of the Beijing detachment), enquired about the local shipyards, and the Shanghai Docks and Engineering Company shipyard was chosen for the construction (according to other sources Dode Engineering). Once the shipyard was chosen (the contract was signed in 1913), the new ship was immediately laid down: the construction took place according to the technical and operational specifications mandated by the Regia Marina and was supervised by an officer of the Tianjin detachment of the Regia Marina. The new ship was named after the sottotenente di vascello (sub-lieutenant) Ermanno Carlotto who fell during the Boxer Rebellion and was decorated with the Gold Medal of Military Valour.

The armaments of the gunboat would consist of two 76.2 mm (3 in) L/40 naval guns (either 1916 or 1917 model, depending on the sources), one forward of the pilothouse and one in the extreme aft part of the deck, and machine guns (six FIAT 8 mm (0.31 in) and two Colt 6.5 mm (0.26 in)). The gunboat could reach a speed of 13.5 kn (15.5 mph; 25.0 km/h). Her propulsion was provided by two Yarrow boilers which originally used coal and were subsequently converted to oil (the oil capacity was 56 tons). The two propellers (capable of reaching 286 rpm) were placed in as many tunnels and thus protected so as not to be damaged by the rocks, while the hull was divided into various compartments. Besides the Italian crew, made up of personnel from the Regia Marina (who, in addition to the ship's armament, were also armed with Carcano mod. 1891 rifles and 7.65 mm Beretta M1917 pistols), Chinese civilians served on the boat as river pilots, cooks and interpreters.

Laid down in March 1914 the ship should have been completed in December, but construction went slowly, as other constructions were prioritized given the imminent outbreak of a world war. In 1915, following the Italian entry into World War I, the construction of Carlotto was suspended because of Chinese neutrality and was only resumed after the end of the war, with the boat being launched in 1918. The gunboat was commissioned in March 1921(other sources, however, place the entry into service on 12 December 1921) and was immediately sent to the Hai river, where conflicts between two Chinese warlords were endangering foreign citizens. On that occasion Carlotto visited some Italian missions which had never been reached by Italian navy ships until then. Later the ship traveled several times on the upper and middle courses of the Yangtze. After returning to Shanghai, the ship went up the Han river, a tributary of the Yangtze River near Hankou, and then the Min river, also a tributary of the Yangtze. During these patrols the gunboat officers for the first time produced detailed nautical charts of these rivers, noting down hydrographic information, flood cycles, currents, shallows and other information needed to navigate the rivers.

==== Service in the 1920s and 1930s ====
In 1923 the gunboat Carlotto has successfully sailed upstream of the Yangtze for over 1,000 miles (never successfully attempted until then) under the command of 1° tenente di vascello (first lieutenant) Alberto Da Zara (the only other two ship officers were the chief engineer, tenente (lieutenant) of the Corps of Naval Engineering Felice Fantin, and the doctor, sottotenente di vascello (sub-lieutenant) Neilson Gerardo Montgomerie): this voyage took the ship where no other unit had hitherto gone, reaching the altitude 200 m (656 ft) above than the starting one (which was at the sea level). The voyage was an idea of Da Zara, who had assumed command of the ship in September 1922 and held it until March 1924 after being promoted in 1923 to capitano di corvetta (corvette captain) (he had indeed requested the command of Carlotto for this express reason).

In mid-February 1923 the gunboat went up the Yangtze River to Nanjing and Jiujiang, to prepare for the ascent, which was to take her beyond Yichang (more than 1,000 miles from the river mouth) and Yibin, on the slopes of Tibet (during a visit on board, a river inspector explained to the crew that beyond Yichang it would only be possible to pay in silver yuans bearing the face of Yuan Shikai). Up to Yichang the Yangtze flowed widely meandering in the middle of a large alluvial plain, while beyond this locality it flowed in a turbulent stream in a very narrow rocky valley, characterized by the Three Gorges which are actually made up of ten large gorges (between Yichang and Guizhoufu, which was located just over halfway between Yichang and Chongqing, the gorge of Yichang, Niu-Kan-Ma-Fei gorge, rapids, Mitan gorge, other rapids, Tiskwan-sai gorge, Wushan gorge, Jeng-ksiang gorge, a stream, Pa Ngnal gorge, the gorge of Hwang Tsao and gorge of Minc Huei), irregular riverbed, rugged banks, numerous obstacles both in the center of the stream and on the sides, which generated opposing currents and eddies, making the stream to reach a speed of 9–13 mph (8–11 kn; 14–21 km/h). After planning the navigation and embarking the elderly and experienced Chinese pilot Tai Li, Carlotto left Yichang on 11 June 1923. After departing Yichang, more than a 1,000 miles from Shanghai, and meeting the first gorge, Carlotto had to face the first rapid (called Taipinkt), in a stretch of river characterized by large and sharp rocks that stretched out towards the center of the bed, producing eddies and countercurrents. In order to advance against the current, which flowed at 8 mph (7 kn; 13 km/h), Carlotto had to increase the speed to 13 kn (15 mph; 24 km/h). After an hour of sailing the gunboat encountered the Kung-Ling rapid, which had previously wrecked other ships, including the German paddle steamer SS Sui Hsiang , which was headed for Chongqing to be the first German vessel to reach it and foundered on the rocks on 28 December 1900.

After passing this rapid, on 12 June the ship encountered the Niu-Kan-Ma-Fei gorge, with rocky walls of more than a 1,000 m (3,281 ft) high that descended to the river bank and then the three-jump rapid of Hsing-T'an, made dangerous by the shallows and eddies that were created in both directions. Passing at low speed near Shin Men over dangerous rocks (where less than two years earlier the French gunboat Doudart De Lagrée ran aground, reporting serious damage), Carlotto approached the rapid of Yeh-T'an, 500–600 m (1,640–1,969 ft) in length with the shape of an isosceles triangle (with the base upstream and the vertex opposite towards the valley), which also proved to be very difficult to negotiate for the previous ships that had tried to pass it (the Royal Navy gunboat HMS Kinsha had given up after three unsuccessful attempts, while the French Olry had only managed to overcome it by being towed from the ground). Da Zara sent all the crew to their posts and told the engine room to keep ready to develop the maximum speed, then maneuvered to approach the right bank, trying to avoid ending up in the countercurrent (which would have run aground or capsized the ship): the Italian gunboat, vibrating and rolling strongly due to the continuous eddies that formed at the bow and at the sides, and approaching continuously to keep to the edges of the counter-currents and in the center of the bed, overcame the rapid proceeding very slowly (at 2–3 kn (2–3 mph; 4–6 km/h), although the ship was pushing at the maximum speed of 13–14 kn (15–16 mph; 24–26 km/h) and the wind called Shang Feng blew the stern against the waves that hit the bow), concluding the maneuver in 22 minutes.

Later the ship faced the Dragon Rapid (which in winter caused an average of three deaths per day among the crews of the junks, but which in summer was more easily traversable)) and the rapid of Hu-T'an, particularly turbulent and flanked, to the right and left, by sharp rocks stretching towards the center of the watercourse, reducing its width to less than a 100 m (328 ft). Carlotto continued in a stretch where other river ships had previously been lost, and, without encountering further difficulties (but sailing only during the day), reached Chongqing on 16 June 1923, 1,344 miles (2,163 km) from the mouth of the Yangtze and 200 m (656 ft) above the sea level, carrying the Italian flag in Chongqing for the first time. The ship, however, continued and on 25 June arrived in Yibin, where the Upper Yangtze began, and she stopped there briefly for some repair work, after which she entered the river Min. After another week of navigation, which had to be accomplished while sounding continuously the riverbed with bamboo canes, on 3 July 1923 Carlotto arrived in Jiading (according to other sources the journey, which began in Yichang on 11 June, ended in Jiading on 20 June), 3,400 km (2,113 miles) from the mouth of the Yangtze and 350 m (1,148 ft) above the sea level, where she remained for two weeks.

The descent of the river, which is also not without difficulties, made Carlotto pass through Nanjing, Hankou and finally Shanghai. Sailing downstream (with the current of up to 15 kn (17 mph; 28 km/h), immediately before the flood season) Carlotto descended from Chongqing to the mouth of the gorges in less than two days, clocking at 26 kn (30 mph; 48 km/h), then, in mid-November, she descended more slowly from Hankou to Shanghai alongside the Italian cruiser Libia . The Italian gunboat was the first ship to arrive at Chongqing from Shanghai (except to spend the winter there), covering a total of almost 5,000 miles (8,047 km) in less than four months. At the end of the voyage, due to the efforts she had been subjected to, the transmission chain that connected the crankshaft to the propeller had lengthened by about 2m. The enterprise had great public resonance, and the Grand Admiral Paolo Thaon di Revel, Minister of the Navy, praised the commander Da Zara, the officers and all crew, especially the engineers. After staying in Shanghai for three months, Da Zara decided to take his leave by organizing a dance ("The Italian Ball") which was well attended by hundreds of Italians residing there.
