= Diego García de Moguer =

Spanish explorer (1484/1496–1544)

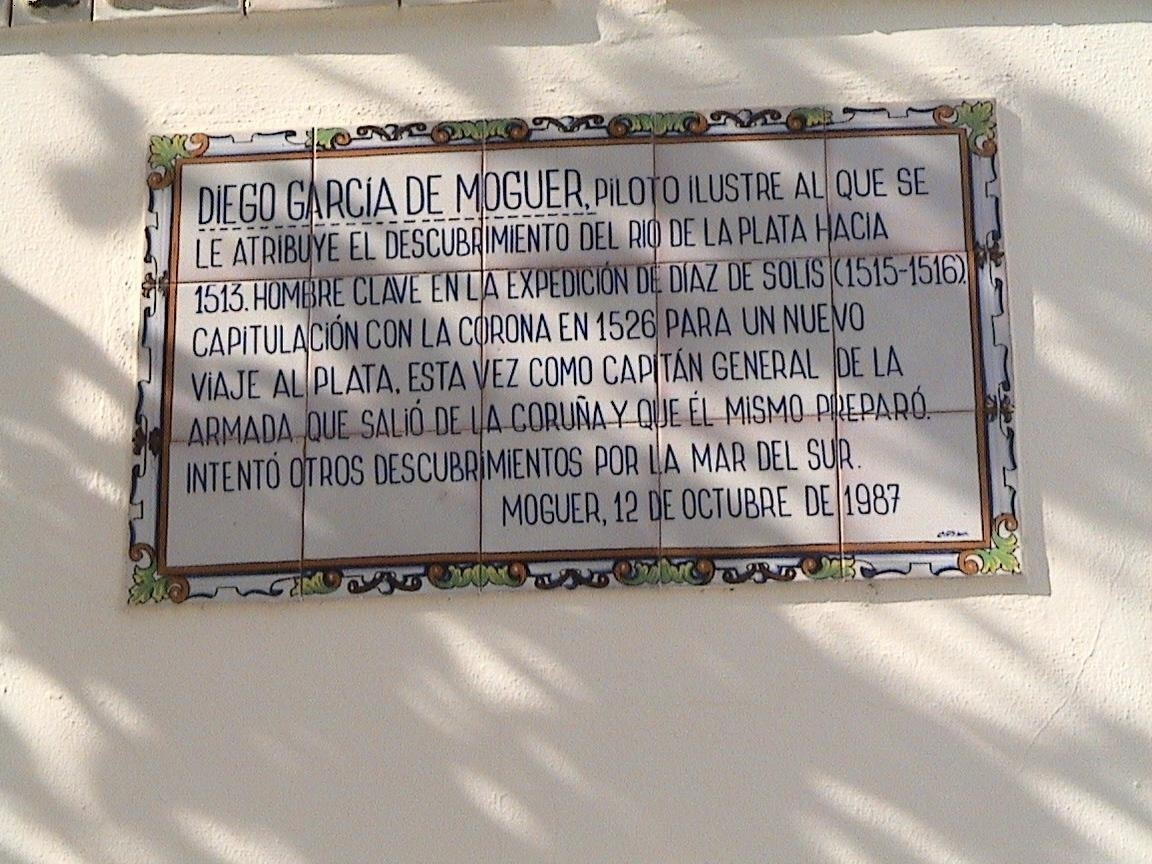
Plaque honoring García

Diego García de Moguer (1484 or 1496–1544) was a Spanish explorer who also sailed for the Portuguese Crown later in life. The Diego Garcia island, the largest of the Chagos Archipelago, is named after him.

== Biography ==
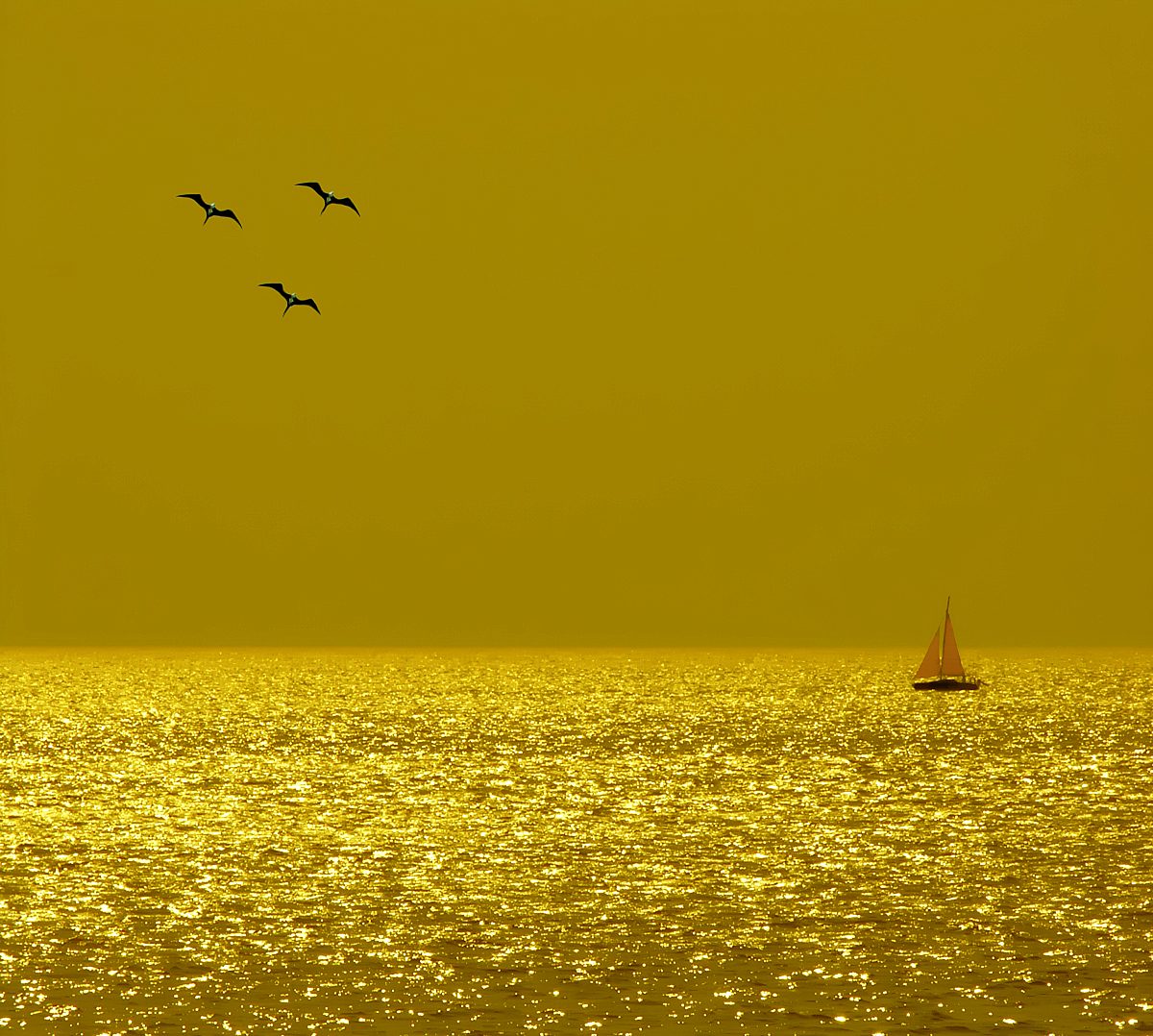
Río de la Plata

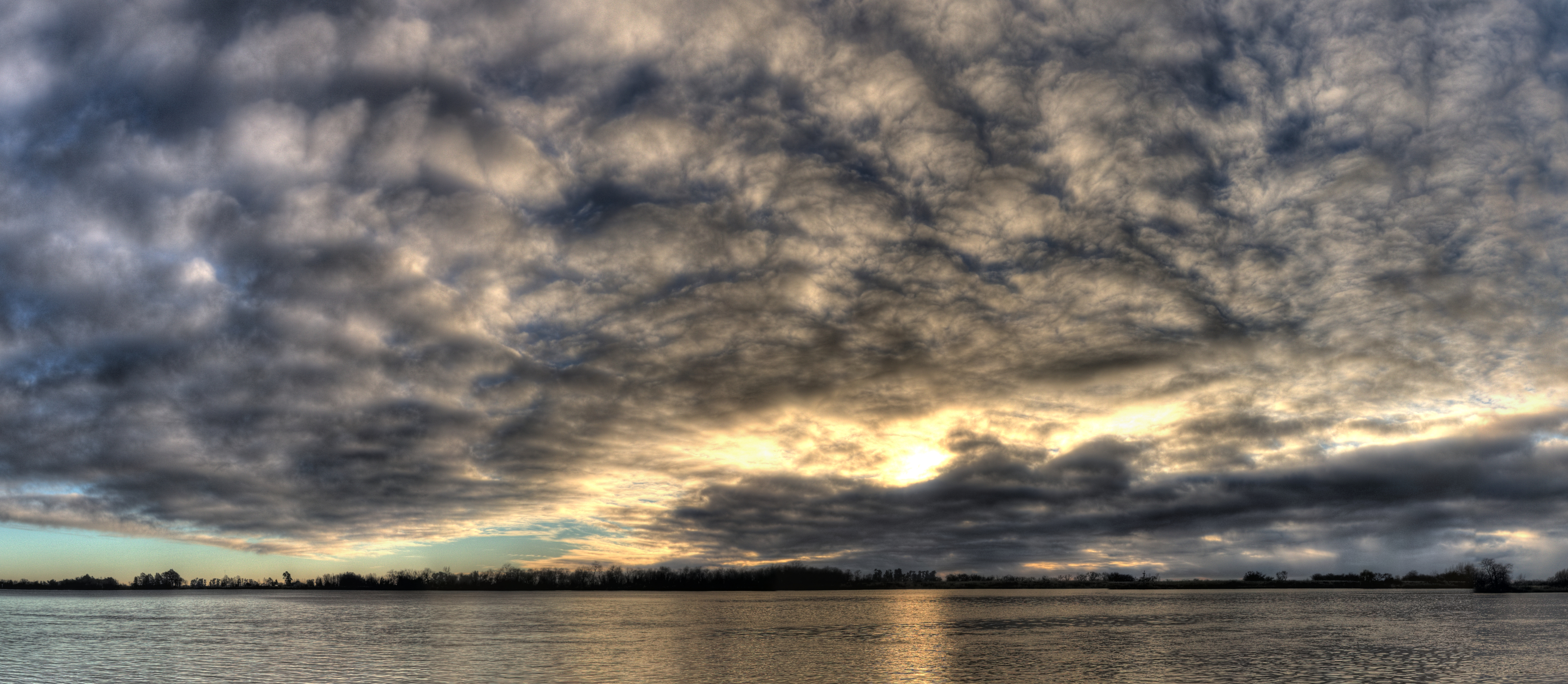
Paraná River

Spanish sources indicate that Diego García was born in Moguer in 1484 (or 1496), but there are Portuguese sources say he was born in Lisbon. However, his first expedition, in 1515, was with Juan Díaz de Solís in search of an oceanic passage leading to the Far East, returning to Spain after the death of Díaz de Solís in the Río de la Plata basin in 1516. He participated in the expedition of Ferdinand Magellan and Juan Sebastián Elcano between 1519 and 1522.

García received approval for a new voyage. According to his own account, Diego García set sail on 15 January 1526, but historians have doubted the accuracy of this date, and are more inclined to accept 15 August 1527 (suggested by chronicler Herrera) as the actual departure date. Diego García sailed from A Coruña, Cape Finisterre, in command of an expedition with three ships. The voyage was financed by merchants to find a suitable spice route, intended to follow Elcano's route and passing through the Magellan Strait. After voyaging through the Atlantic Ocean, García arrived on the south coast of Brazil. In February 1528, he explored the area around the Río de la Plata, an excursion documented in José Toribio Medina's Los viajes de Diego García de Moguer (The travels of Diego García de Moguer).

As he navigated through the Paraná River in early 1528, he met men from the Sebastian Cabot group. He was informed that Cabot was at the fort of Sancti Spiritu located at the confluence of the Paraná River in Carcarañá. With a ship and a barquentine, García navigated the Paraná River, arriving at the Sancti Spiritu fort. He was surprised and indignant to find Cabot there. He ordered Captain Caro to abandon the place as he, García, alone had been charged by Spain to explore the region. However, after it was explained that Cabot was also in the service of Spain, they joined forces. García continued upstream between what are now the towns of Goya and Bella Vista where he met Cabot who forced him to cooperate in trying to find the legendary Sierra de la Plata.

Together they explored the Pilcomayo River and then followed it as far as the strait. Garcia and Cabot continued their attempts to explore the mythical kingdom about which they had heard from Captain Francisco Cesar, hearing that the place was rich in gold, silver, and sheep (llamas) with which fabrics were made. It was the Inca Empire of the legendary City of the Caesars in Chile. Arguments between García and Cabot eventually ended both expeditions, the two men returning to Spain to settle their disputes through legal measures. The dispute arose as García claimed full control of the area he had explored. In the court case which was held in Spain the verdict went in favour of García. The reason was that Cabot who was assigned to go to the Spice Islands never went there but explored the Sierra de la Plata which was a violation. As a punishment he was exiled for two years to Oran.

As a result of all the feuding between García and Cabot, the Spaniards failed to ensure the defense of the fort at Sancti Spiritus, which was attacked by the natives in September 1529 while Cabot and García were in San Salvador. In late September or early October 1529, García's caravel traveled to the Ducks Bay (in southern Brazil), picked up Francisco García (who belonged to Cabot's expedition) and traveled to Spain, arriving there on 28 July 1530.

Cabot abandoned a planned expedition to the Spice Islands. Instead, on 21 May 1534, Diego García de Moguer sailed his caravel Concepción back to Río de la Plata. He passed the Cape Verde island of Santiago, then continued to Brazil and on to the estuary of the Uruguay and Paraná rivers.

He re-discovered the island of Diego Garcia in the 16th century, then in the service of Portugal.
