= Carcarañá River =

River in Argentina

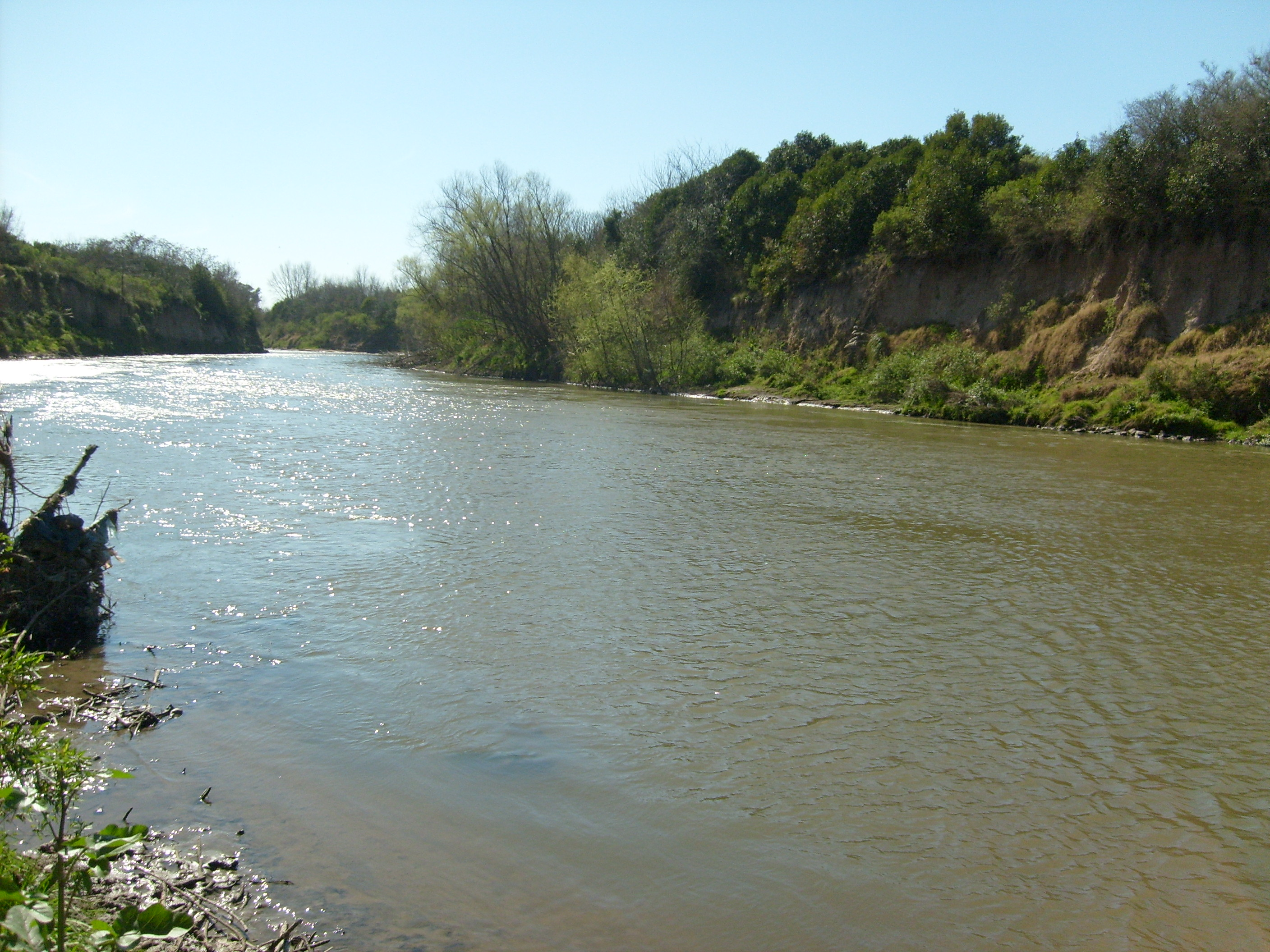
Carcarañá river in Argentina

The Carcarañá River (Spanish, Arroyo Saladillo or Río Saladillo) is a river in Argentina. It begins at the confluence of the Río Tercero and the Saladillo River (the lower course of the Río Cuarto) in the south-east of the province of Córdoba (near Cruz Alta, at 33°01′S 61°48′W) and flows eastward into the province of Santa Fe, which it crosses.

In Santa Fe the river first turns south, then east and finally north-east, passing by the city of Carcarañá. It receives the waters of the Cañada de Gómez (near the city of the same name, at 32°51′S 61°9′W), develops cascades and becomes constrained within ravines up to 20 metres (66 ft) high. It then turns north and empties into the Coronda River (Río Coronda) or Riacho Coronda), south of Gaboto. The Coronda empties into the Paraná River about 7 kilometres (4 mi) below the mouth of the Carcarañá, at 32°30′5″S 60°47′45″W.

The Carcarañá basin comprises 2 percent of the territory of Santa Fe and 4 percent of its population lives within it. It has a total length of 240 kilometres (150 mi) and it is navigable only by medium ships. It passes by or near the cities and towns of Inriville, Los Surgentes and Cruz Alta in Córdoba, and Arteaga, San José de la Esquina, Los Nogales, Arequito, Los Molinos, Casilda, Carcarañá, Andino and Gaboto in Santa Fe, traversing one of the richest agricultural districts in the world.

The Carcarañá's potential for the generation of hydroelectricity was taken advantage of since the 19th century and until the 1930s.

== History ==
The mouth of the Carcarañá River was the location of the first European settlement in the Río de la Plata region and present-day Argentina. In 1527 Sebastian Cabot, a Venetian at the service of Spain, established the Sancti Spiritus Fort there. Years later this was also the meeting point of Juan de Garay, founder of the city of Santa Fe, and the envoy of Jerónimo Luis de Cabrera, founder of Córdoba.
