= Sancti Spiritu (Argentina) =

Settlement established by Sebastian Cabot in 1527

Coordinates: 32°26′31″S 60°48′19″W

Location in Argentina of Sancti Spiritu fortification

Sancti Spiritu was a fortification established in 1527 near the Paraná River by the explorer Sebastian Cabot. It was the first European settlement in the territory of modern Argentina and was destroyed by Amerindians (Native Argentines) two years later.

== Antecedents ==
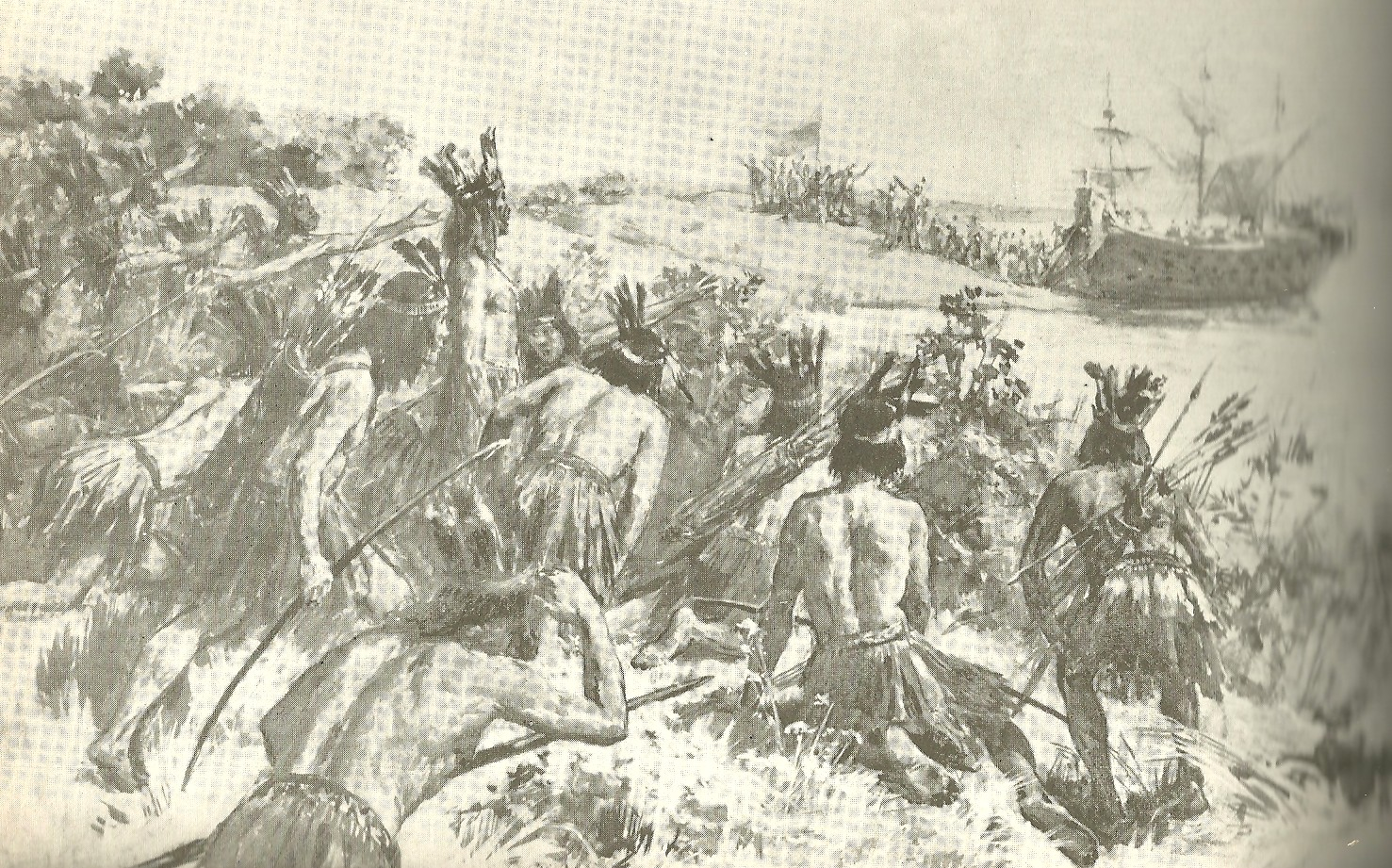
Discovery of the Río de la Plata by Juan Díaz de Solís. He was later attacked and killed by Charrúas.

The voyage of Juan Díaz de Solís explored the Río de la Plata, along the coast of Uruguay. In 1516, Solís disembarked on the Uruguay coast shortly after entering the Uruguay River, along with six other men. The local Charrúas saw them and killed them in a swift surprise attack. A boy, Francisco del Puerto, was spared because of his young age. The remaining sailors left and returned to Europe.

Del Puerto, who was left behind, lived for ten years among the indigenous people. He was rescued by a subsequent European voyage led by Sebastian Cabot. Del Puerto told Cabot rumors of a "white king" and a mountain of silver that was located north of the Paraná River. Cabot considered the tale to be true, and dropped his initial orders (to seek a path to the Indies shorter than the one found by the Magellan-Elcano expedition) in order to look for the mountain. The rumor was ultimately proved to be false; there were no precious metals in the La Plata basin. But the European belief in the rumor was one of the reasons for the name of Argentina.

== Establishment ==
The Sancti Spiritu fort was built next to the Carcarañá River, in what is currently Santa Fe Province. The Spanish enjoyed the warm climate, and Cabot built a house nearby. They got help from the Amerindians, and the priest Francisco García provided religious support. The Amerindians were initially friendly towards the Spanish.

Cabot left the fort on December 23, in a ship with 130 men, in a quest to find the empire of the White King. He left the other 32 men at the fort. The expedition was a harsh one and the Amerindians were forced into obedience. As a result, they left and did not provide any more food. Many Spaniards did not agree with the actions of Cabot and attempted to mutiny, but after Francisco García revealed their plan, their leader was executed.

The voyage stopped near the Paraguay River, after hearing there were new ships in the area. Miguel Riflos led some further explorations with 30 men, but most of them died during a mutiny of Del Puerto against Núñez de Balboa, caused by personal enmity. The new ships, which intercepted Cabot before his return to Sancti Spiritu, were led by Diego García de Moguer, who had taken part in the old voyage of Solís. They discussed the validity of exclusive navigation rights on the river, but finally agreed to return to the fort, join forces, request Spanish aid and embark on a second expedition against the White King.

== Destruction ==
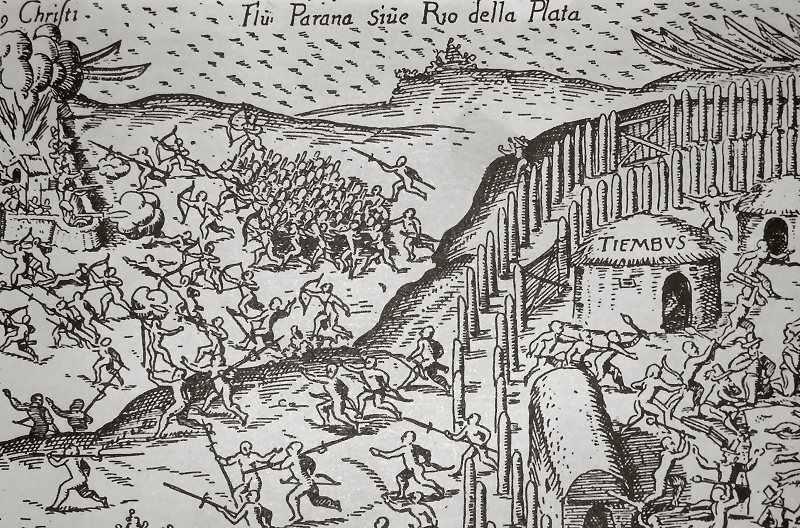
Destruction of the Sancti Spiritu fort

Cabot sent three groups of scouts to the west, to seek more information about the White King, but then left the fort without waiting for their return. However, Cabot returned to the fort almost immediately, as he learned that the indigenous peoples in Paraguay and around the fort had become hostile to the Spaniards and had organized a rebellion against them. Cabot and Moguer returned to the fort, where Gregorio Caro had relaxed military discipline. They ordered him to kill a hundred Amerindians as a deterrent, and Cabot abused the cacique Yaguari. The measures were not effective, and the Amerindians became more hostile. Military discipline was still relaxed, despite the return of Cabot.

Cabot organized a punitive expedition to Paraguay, again leaving Caro in charge of the fort. Cabot confirmed that the Amerindians were about to attack the fort, but continued to the north, trusting that Caro would be able to defend it. The attack came on the night of September 1, 1529. The Amerindians set the fort on fire while all the soldiers were sleeping. When they woke up, realizing defense would be useless, they tried to board the two ships and flee. Most of them were killed and one of the ships was destroyed before it could leave.

The survivors joined Cabot and García who immediately returned to help. By the time they returned, all remaining Spaniards were dead, and the fort had been burned and razed to the ground. Completely defeated, they left the Americas and returned to Europe.

== Consequences ==
The destruction of Sancti Spiritu ended the period of Spanish exploration of Argentina, leading to the period of colonization. The rumors of the White King and the silver mountain continued to raise interest in Spain and Portugal. Spain sent Pedro de Mendoza to colonize the area before Portugal could do so. This led to the establishment of the city of Buenos Aires, near the mouth of the River Paraná.

Ruy Díaz de Guzmán wrote a history of Sancti Spiritu in his book La Argentina (1612). The book included the story of a woman named Lucía Miranda, involved in a love triangle with a Spaniard and a cacique. Miranda's relationships were said to have inadvertently helped the success of the Amerindians' attack on the fort. The story was repeated by later chroniclers and historians, but it is now known that it was fictitious: there was no woman among the crew of Sebastian Cabot.

== See also ==
- Colonial Argentina

== Bibliography ==
- Abad de Santillán, Diego. Historia Argentina (in Spanish). Buenos Aires: TEA (Tipográfica Editora Argentina).
