= Italian gunboat Sebastiano Caboto =

Italian gunboat

History

Italy
- Name: Sebastiano Caboto
- Namesake: Sebastian Cabot (c. 1474–1557), Italian explorer
- Ordered: 1910
- Builder: Cantieri Navali Riuniti, Genoa or Palermo, Italy (see text)
- Laid down: March 1911
- Launched: 20 July 1913
- Completed: November 1913
- Commissioned: 23 November 1913
- Reclassified: Submarine tender 1938
- Fate: Possibly scuttled 9 September 1943 (see text); Captured 12 September 1943

Nazi Germany
- Name: Sebastiano Caboto
- Namesake: Previous name retained
- Acquired: 12 September 1943
- Commissioned: never
- Fate: Sunk September–October 1943 (see text)

General characteristics
- Type: River gunboat
- Displacement: 778 t (766 long tons) standard; 877 t (863 long tons) normal load; 1,049 t (1,032 long tons) full load
- Length: 63.4 m (208 ft) overall; 60 m (200 ft) lbp
- Beam: 9.94 m (32 ft 7 in)
- Draught: 2.7 or 2.97 m (8 ft 10 in or 9 ft 9 in) (medium); 3.02 or 3.4 m (9 ft 11 in or 11 ft 2 in) (maximum)
- Installed power: 1,100 hp (810 kW)
- Propulsion: 2 × cylindrical coal-fired boilers; 2 × triple-expansion reciprocating steam engines, 1,000 hp (746 kW); 2 × shafts
- Speed: 13.2 kn (24.4 km/h; 15.2 mph)
- Range: 3,600 nmi (6,670 km; 4,140 mi) at 9 knots (17 km/h; 10 mph)
- Complement: either 6 officers and 117 enlisted men or 107 officers and enlisted men (see text)
- Armament: 6 × 76/40 mm Armstrong/Vickers guns; 4 x 6.5/80 mm Maxim machine guns

Sebastiano Caboto was a vessel of the Italian Regia Marina ("Royal Navy") in commission from 1913 to 1943. She operated as a river gunboat — some sources describe her as an "oceanic gunboat" or "colonial-service gunboat" — from 1913 to 1938, then as a submarine tender. She was named in honor of the Italian explorer Sebastian Cabot.

== Design and construction ==
By the early 1900s, Italian traders and entrepreneurs were managing commercial activities in China, especially along the Yangtze. Italians had built textile factories in China and were managing other commercial interests; for example, the importation of coral, which was processed in Italy mainly by artisan companies in Naples and then exported again to East Asia, had become an important activity. For economic reasons, the Italian Regia Marina ("Royal Navy") could no longer afford to station warships in East Asia, and in any event the Regia Marina′s ships were too large to operate without difficulty upstream of Woosung (now Wusong) or Hankow (now Hankou) on the Yangtze. For years, France had assumed the responsibility for the protection of Italian communities in China. After the ambassador of the Kingdom of Italy in Peking (now Beijing) contacted him about a need for Italian protection of Italian communities along Chinese rivers, and in particular those on the upper Yangtze and the Peiho, the Italian minister of foreign affairs requested that the Regia Marina take steps to address the issue. The Regia Marina decided to build two river gunboats for service in China.

The Regia Marina ordered the first gunboat, Sebastiano Caboto, in 1910. Colonnello del Genio Navale ("Colonel of the Naval Engineers") Ettore Berghinz designed her, and she was laid down in March 1911. Sources agree that Cantieri Navali Riuniti ("United Shipyards") of Genoa built the ship, but disagree on whether construction took place at the company's shipyard at Genoa or Palermo. Launched on 20 July 1913, she was completed in November 1913.

At 1,000 displacement tons, Sebastiano Caboto was large for a river gunboat, making her capable of crossing the open ocean, but a precise distribution of weight gave her a very shallow draft which, combined with her good maneuverability, allowed her to navigate rivers easily. According to some sources, Berghinz designed Sebastiano Caboto to operate on rivers in South America, in particular the Amazon River, to protect Italian colonists there. As built, she was equipped with a circular saw that could be mounted on her bow almost at the waterline, allowing her to extricate herself from the roots of mangroves along rivers such as the Amazon, as well as to break through barriers of logs carried by the current. With the situation calm in South America, Sebastiano Caboto instead was allocated to duty in China, and the saw was landed.

Sebastiano Caboto′s armament consisted of six 76/40 mm Armstrong/Vickers guns and four 6.5/80 mm Maxim machine guns One of the 76 mm guns was located on the bow, a second on the stern, two on the port side, and two on the starboard side. Two of the machine guns were located on the bow and two on the stern. According to one source, the crew consisted of six officers (the commanding officer, two ship's officers, an engineer, a commissary, and a doctor) and 117 petty officers and sailors, although another source places her total crew at 107.

Sebastiano Caboto′s propulsion system consisted of two triple-expansion reciprocating steam engines powered by two coal-burning low-pressure cylindrical boilers operating at 12.6 kilograms per square centimeter (179.21 psi). The engines produced a combined 1,000 horsepower (746 kW), allowing a maximum speed of 13.2 knots (24.4 km/h; 15.2 mph). At an economical cruising speed of 9 knots (17 km/h; 10 mph) and with the maximum amount of coal she could bring aboard (100 or 190 tons, according to different sources) the ship could travel 3,600 nautical miles (6,670 km; 4,140 mi), enough to cross the Atlantic Ocean. She also had a substantial sailing rig: Her mainmast had two yards and could carry a square sail, a mainsail, and a counter mainsail, while her mizzenmast, with only one yard, could carry a mainsail and a counter mainsail.

In her operations, Sebastiano Caboto revealed excellent nautical qualities, proving to be manoeuvrable, easy to handle, sufficiently powerful, and capable of economical long-range operations: On 100 tons of coal she could steam 1,356 nautical miles (2,511 km; 1,560 mi). One flaw was her tendency to roll, so her crew often used her sails to better stabilize her as well as slightly increase her speed.

== Operational history ==
=== 1913–1915 ===
After entering service on 23 November 1913, Sebastiano Caboto moved from Palermo to Naples for her fitting out. After its completion, she departed Naples on 11 December 1913 bound for Shanghai. She made the approximately 10,000-nautical-mile (18,500 km; 11,500 mi) voyage in 110 days, 51 of which were spent at sea and 59 in port. After leaving Naples she called at Port Said, Massawa, Rakmat, Aden, Karachi, Bombay, Colombo, Singapore, and Saigon before arriving in March 1914 in Hong Kong, where she met the armored cruiser Marco Polo, which was about to return to Italy. Departing Hong Kong on 29 March 1914, Sebastiano Caboto made stops at Canton (now Guangzhou) and Macau before arriving at Shanghai on 2 April 1914.

As soon as a reorganization, which lasted for almost a month after her arrival, was complete, Sebastiano Caboto began operations, departing Shanghai on 28 April 1914 and steaming up the rivers to the limit of their navigability, in particular up the Yangtze. Although her draft prevented her from operating on the upper Yangtze between Yichang and Suifu (now Yibin), she could navigate the middle and lower Yangtze from is mouth to Yichang. She steamed up the Yangtze to Chungking (now Chongqing), negotiating a very torturous stretch of the river: In the stretch between Yichang and Chungking there were, in addition to numerous whirlpools and countercurrents, about 70 rapids, the level of which could vary, and numerous canyons, varying in length from 5 to 25 miles (8 to 40 km) and in width from 50 to 150 metres (55 to 164 yd), surrounded by hills and mountains whose altitude varied from 100 to 1,000 metres (330 to 3,300 ft), and with a difference in altitude of 100 metres (328 ft) in 86 miles (138 km). In May 1914 Sebastiano Caboto was in Hankow (now Hankou), went up the Yangtze to Cheling, crossed Lake Tung-Ting (now Dongting Lake), and then went up the Xiang River, a tributary of the Yangtze, reaching Changsha in Hunan Province, 950 miles (1,529 km) from the sea. Religious missions, who now found themselves protected from attacks by pirates, stragglers, and the armed forces of Chinese warlords and continuously warring Chinese factions, greeted her with great enthusiasm. Despite the many difficulties and dangers she encountered, she never needed to use her weapons, as her mere presence acted as a deterrent without her having to open fire. During the voyage from Italy to China, she had consumed all of the warranted fire hours for her boilers and operating hours for her steam engines, so after operating on the Chinese rivers for a month, she entered dry dock for end-of-warranty work.

After completion of her drydock work, Sebastiano Caboto resumed operations on Chinese rivers. In July 1914 she was in Nanking (now Nanjing) and later in Tientsin (now Tianjin). During this period, she sometimes became involved in armed conflict and had to use her weapons. At the beginning of August 1914, as World War I broke out in Europe, she went to Tsingtao (now Qingdao).

=== World War I ===
After Italy entered World War I on the side of the Allies in May 1915, the Republic of China remained neutral and Sebastiano Caboto risked internment by Chinese authorities, but she avoided this by ignoring Chinese demands that she submit to internment, cutting her moorings, and quickly departing for Nagasaki, Japan, where she remained for 18 months. When China also entered the war on the side of the Allies in December 1917, Sebastiano Caboto returned to her patrol duties on Chinese rivers. In 1918, a group of prisoners of war of Italian ethnicity captured by Russian forces while serving in the Austro-Hungarian Army and sent from the Russian Empire to Tientsin, where Italian authorities had promised them repatriation to Italy, grew tired of waiting for repatriation and rebelled. They were arrested, and on 10 June 1918 Sebastiano Caboto embarked about a hundred of them. After spending a night on the ship, the former prisoners of war were taken to the Si-Juan concentration camp in Peking.

=== 1919–1934 ===
World War I ended in November 1918. In 1921 a second Regia Marina gunboat, the smaller Ermanno Carlotto, whose construction had been interrupted by World War I, joined Sebastiano Caboto in China. Between January and March 1923, Sebastiano Caboto was in Hong Kong. On 6 April 1924, Lieutenant Commander Angelo Iachino, a future admiral, assumed command of Ermanno Carlotto and, noting the worsening of internal conflicts in China, expressed hope for the sending of an expeditionary force that could carry out international police duties: As a result, the Naval Division was established in East Asia. During the summer of 1924, Sebastiano Caboto conducted a cruise in the waters of Siberia, stopping at Vladivostok and a number of smaller ports.

During these years, Sebastiano Caboto and Ermanno Carloto had the task of protecting Italian missions in China, which, as had occurred prior to World War I, often came under threat of looting by river pirates and the forces of Chinese warlords. The two gunboats also policed shipping on Chinese rivers. Italian standards for the ownership and crewing of Italian-flagged vessels required that shipping companies that owned them have corporate capital that was majority Italian and that the ships themselves have an Italian captain and a crew that was at least two-thirds Italian, even if the crew's composition otherwise was in compliance with regulations in China. Many of the Italian-flagged ships Italian-Chinese shipping companies owned had come under the control of Chinese captains who used them to smuggle weapons. Although Italian agreements with China prohibited Chinese authorities from stopping and inspecting Italian-flagged ships — something viewed as intolerable for the credibility and prestige of the Italian shipping companies and, by extension, of Italy itself — Chinese authorities made several attempts to inspect Italian-flagged ships for illegal activities. Sebastiano Caboto and Ermanno Carloto therefore monitored Italian-flagged ships belonging to Italian-Chinese shipping companies for compliance with Italian requirements and to detect any illegal activities, and they reported ships which did not comply with legal and regulatory requirements to Italian consulate authorities, who could withdraw authorization to use of the Italian flag.

During the first half of the 1920s, Sebastiano Caboto and Ermanno Carloto, reinforced at different times by the protected cruiser Libia, the torpedo boat Calabria, and the armored cruiser San Giorgio, found the task of protecting Italian communities and interests in China complicated by Chinese civil conflicts. Sebastiano Caboto often visited Chinese "treaty ports" and steamed up the Yangtze to Hankow, remaining mainly in the lower reaches of the river because of her draft.

During the second half of the 1920s and the early 1930s, the destroyer Muggia alternated on duties in China, joining Sebastiano Caboto, Ermanno Carloto, and Libia in forming the Italian naval squadron there. The transport Volta, the heavy cruiser Trento. and the destroyer Espero also made deployments to China. In March 1925 the Far East Naval Command included Libia, Sebastiano Caboto, Ermanno Carlotto, and San Giorgio. In 1926 Sebastiano Caboto deployed to Shanghai to protect Italian interests in the city, but in the following years, except for regular visits to Shanghai and Hankow, she was mainly based at Tientsin. In 1932, following the 1931 Japanese invasion of Manchuria and problems that resulted from it, the Far Eastern Naval Division was reconstituted under the command of Admiral Domenico Cavagnari and consisted of Trento (Cavagnari's flagship), Libia, Espero, Sebastiano Caboto, and Ermanno Carlotto. Later the protected cruiser Quarto replaced Trento, Libia, and Espero in East Asia.

By 1934, after 20 years of service on Chinese rivers, Sebatiano Caboto was worn out and losing operational efficiency: Her hull had become worn and her propulsion system no longer could develop sufficient speed to counteract river currents. The modern minelayer Lepanto arrived in China to replace her, and on 7 August 1934 Sebastiano Caboto left the mouth of the Yangtze to return to Italy. During her five-and-a-half-month voyage, she stopped at almost all the same ports she had visited during her voyage to China 20 years earlier.

=== 1935–1940 ===
During her voyage to Italy, Sebastiano Caboto received orders to place herself under the command of the Italian East Africa Naval Command at Massawa; sources disagree on whether she received the orders on 19 January 1935 while in port at Aden or after she already had reached Massawa. She subsequently returned to the Mediterranean and deployed to Rhodes in the Italian Dodecanese for duty under the Aegean Naval Command In 1938 she was reclassified as a submarine tender.

=== World War II ===
With its invasion of France on 10 June 1940, Italy entered World War II on the side of the Axis powers. At the time, Sebastiano Caboto was part of the Auxiliary Ships Group of the Aegean Sea Naval Command, based at Rhodes. During the war, she continued to operate as a submarine tender, always based at Rhodes. She often participated with her shipboard armament in the anti-aircraft defense of the island from frequent, but usually unsuccessful, British air attacks. The crew often took the opportunity to enrich their meals with fish, particularly mullet, killed by explosions during the air raids.

On 25 May 1941, during the preparation of a convoy that would land an Italian expeditionary force in Crete to take part in the German invasion of the island, Aldo Cocchia, the commander of the convoy, requested that Sebastiano Caboto take part in the operation. Higher command rejected the request on the grounds that Sebastiano Caboto, although small and old, was registered in the naval register as a cruiser and it was undesirable to give the Allies an opportunity to announce the sinking of a cruiser if she were lost during the operation.

The Kingdom of Italy proclaimed an armistice with the Allies on 8 September 1943, and Nazi Germany immediately began the Dodecanese campaign to seize control of the Italian islands in the Aegean, including Rhodes. Sebastiano Caboto was still at Rhodes, under the orders of Lieutenant Commander Corradini. The ship was in no condition to either participate in the Battle of Rhodes or flee the island, so Corradini disembarked weapons and supplies to reinforce the Italian defenses ashore. According to one source, the ship was scuttled in shallow water at Rhodes on 9 September 1943 to prevent her capture intact by the Germans. According to other sources, Sebastiano Caboto was moored in port with her engines stopped and only a small crew aboard — most of her crew having disembarked without Corradini's consent so as to avoid having to fight the Germans — when armed German soldiers boarded the ship on 11 September 1943. Sources agree that German forces captured her on 12 September 1943 when Corradini and the remaining crew, after destroying documents and archives, disembarked, bringing with them the ship's battle flag, after receiving the salute from German sentries. However, the ship's Italian flag was not lowered until 17 September 1943.

After capturing Sebastiano Caboto, the Germans refloated her, but her time under Kriegsmarine control was short. Sources provide differeng accounts of her fate. Some sources claim she was sunk in an Allied air attack in September 1943, perhaps on 15 September 1943 while repairs were underway, sinking in the same place where she had scuttled herself. According to some sources, however, she suffered damage at Rhodes in an Allied air raid on 19 September 1943, hit near the forecastle. Some sources claim she was sunk in an Allied air raid in October 1943.
