= Corps of Naval Engineering =

Military unit of the Italian Navy

- Coat of Arms of the Italian Navy Naval Engineers
- Active: 1861 – Present
- Country: Italy
- Branch: Italian Navy
- Type: Naval engineering
- Patron: Saint Barbara

The Corps of Naval Engineering (Italian: Corpo del genio navale) is part of the Italian Navy under the control of the Ministry of Defence.

== Mission ==
The Corps of Naval Engineering is responsible for the maintenance and development of the Navy's shipbuilding material. The officers of naval engineering are serving both as engineer officers on board naval vessels, both in the management personnel of the Navy technical bodies, especially the Naval Arsenal. On board, the officers carry out tasks of responsibility regarding the propulsion, the generation of electricity, the hull, the security and all the installations not on-board electronics. They arrive to the appointment of Chief Engineer. On land you have instead support duties in the arsenals for vessels in the work, to aid in the design of new units and responsibility in the technical environment.
